= List of Prasophyllum species =

The following is a list of species of Prasophyllum recognised by the Plants of the World Online as at May 2025, and a few additional species recognised by the Australian Plant Census**. The common names in the list below are generally those used by David Jones. Australian authorities recognise some of the names below as synonyms.*

- Prasophyllum abblittiorum P.A.Collier (Tas.)
- Prasophyllum affine Lindl.1840 – Jervis Bay leek orchid, heathland leek orchid (N.S.W)
- Prasophyllum albovirens D.L.Jones & L.M.Copel. (N.S.W.)
- Prasophyllum album R.S.Rogers (S.A.)
- Prasophyllum alpestre D.L.Jones** – mauve leek orchid (N.S.W., Vic., Tas.)
- Prasophyllum alpinum R.Br. – alpine leek orchid (Tas.)
- Prasophyllum amoenum D.L.Jones – dainty leek orchid, Snug leek orchid (Tas.)
- Prasophyllum anticum D.L.Jones & D.T.Rouse – Pretty Hill leek orchid (Vic.)
- Prasophyllum apoxychilum D.L.Jones – tapered leek orchid (Tas.)
- Prasophyllum argillaceum D.L.Jones & D.T.Rouse (Vic.)
- Prasophyllum asinantum R.J.Bates (S.A.)
- Prasophyllum atratum D.L.Jones – Three Hummock leek orchid (Tas.)
- Prasophyllum australe R.Br. – southern leek orchid, austral leek orchid (Qld., N.S.W., Vic., Tas., S.A.)
- Prasophyllum bagoense D.L.Jones – Bago leek orchid (N.S.W.)
- Prasophyllum barnettii D.L.Jones & D.T.Rouse – Anglesea leek orchid (Vic.)
- Prasophyllum basalticum D.L.Jones & L.M.Copel. (N.S.W.)
- Prasophyllum beatrix D.L.Jones & D.T.Rouse – Marung leek orchid (N.S.W., Vic.)
- Prasophyllum brevilabre (Lindl.) Hook.f. – short-lip leek orchid (Qld., N.S.W., Vic., Tas.)
- Prasophyllum brevisepalum D.L.Jones & L.M.Copel. (N.S.W.)
- Prasophyllum brownii Rchb.f. – Christmas leek orchid (W.A.)
- Prasophyllum calcicola R.J.Bates – limestone leek orchid (W.A., S.A.)
- Prasophyllum campestre R.J.Bates & D.L.Jones – sandplain leek orchid (N.S.W., Qld.)
- Prasophyllum canaliculatum D.L.Jones – channelled leek orchid, summer leek orchid (N.S.W.)
- Prasophyllum candidum R.J.Bates & D.L.Jones – Kiandra leek orchid (N.S.W., Vic.)
- Prasophyllum caricetum D.L.Jones – Cathcart leek orchid (N.S.W.)
- Prasophyllum castaneum D.L.Jones – chestnut leek orchid (Tas.)
- Prasophyllum catenemum D.L.Jones (S.A.)
- Prasophyllum caudiculum D.L.Jones – Guyra leek orchid (N.S.W.)
- Prasophyllum colemaniarum R.S.Rogers (Vic., extinct)
- Prasophyllum colensoi Hook.f. N.Z.
- Prasophyllum collinum D.L.Jones (S.A.)
- Prasophyllum concinnum Nicholls – trim leek orchid (Tas.)
- Prasophyllum constrictum R.S.Rogers (1909) – tawny leek orchid (S.A., Tas., Vic.)
- Prasophyllum copelandii D.L.Jones (N.S.W.)
- Prasophyllum correctum D.L.Jones – gaping leek orchid, Bairnsdale leek orchid (Vic.)
- Prasophyllum crassum D.L.Jones & R.J.Bates (S.A.)
- Prasophyllum crebriflorum D.L.Jones – crowded leek orchid (Tas.)
- Prasophyllum cucullatum Rchb.f. – hooded leek orchid (W.A.)
- Prasophyllum cuneatum D.L.Jones & G.Brockman (W.A.)
- Prasophyllum cyphochilum Benth. – pouched leek orchid (W.A.)
- Prasophyllum diversiflorum Nicholls – Gorae leek orchid (Vic.)
- Prasophyllum dossenum R.J.Bates & D.L.Jones (N.S.W.)
- Prasophyllum drummondii Rchb.f. – swamp leek orchid (W.A.)
- Prasophyllum elatum R.Br. – tall leek orchid, snake orchid, piano orchid (all Australian states)
- Prasophyllum elegantissimum Lehnebach 2025 – elegant leek orchid (N.Z.)
- Prasophyllum erythrocommum D.l.Jones & D.T.Rouse – tan leek orchid (Vic.)
- Prasophyllum exile D.L.Jones & R.J.Bates (Qld., N.S.W.)
- Prasophyllum favonium D.L.Jones – western leek orchid (Tas.)
- Prasophyllum fecundum R.J.Bates – self-pollinating leek orchid (S.A.)
- Prasophyllum fimbria Rchb.f. – fringed leek orchid (W.A.)
- Prasophyllum fitzgeraldii R.S.Rogers & Maiden – Fitzgerald's leek orchid (S.A.)
- Prasophyllum flavum R.Br. – yellow leek orchid (N.S.W., Qld., Vic., Tas.)
- Prasophyllum fosteri D.L.Jones – Shelford leek orchid (Vic.)
- Prasophyllum frenchii F.Muell. – maroon leek orchid, swamp leek orchid (Vic., S.A.)
- Prasophyllum fuscum R.Br. – slaty leek orchid, tawny leek orchid (N.S.W.)
- Prasophyllum gibbosum R.Br. – humped leek orchid (W.A.)
- Prasophyllum giganteum Lindl. – bronze leek orchid (W.A.)
- Prasophyllum gilgai D.L.Jones & D.T. Rouse – gilgai leek orchid (Vic.)
- Prasophyllum goldsackii J.Z.Weber & R.J.Bates – Goldsack's leek orchid (S.A.)
- Prasophyllum gracile Lindl. – little laughing leek orchid (W.A.)
- Prasophyllum gracillimum Nicholls – slender leek orchid (W.A.)
- Prasophyllum graniticola D.L.Jones & L.M.Copel. (N.S.W.)
- Prasophyllum gravesii R.J.Bates (S.A.)
- Prasophyllum hectorii (Buchanan) Molloy, D.L.Jones & M.A.Clem – swamp leek orchid (N.Z.)
- Prasophyllum helophilum D.L.Jones & D.T.Rouse (N.S.W.)
- Prasophyllum hians Rchb.f. – yawning leek orchid (W.A.)
- Prasophyllum holzingeri D.L.Jones & L.M.Copel. (N.S.W.)
- Prasophyllum hygrophilum D.L.Jones & D.T.Rouse – swamp leek orchid (Vic.)
- Prasophyllum incompositum D.L.Jones (Qld.)
- Prasophyllum incorrectum D.L.Jones – golfer's leek orchid (Tas.)
- Prasophyllum incurvum D.L.Jones (Tas.)
- Prasophyllum innubum D.L.Jones – Brandy Mary's leek orchid (N.S.W.)
- Prasophyllum jeaneganiae D.L.Jones (N.S.W., A.C.T.)
- Prasophyllum keltonii D.L.Jones – Kelton's leek orchid (N.S.W.)
- Prasophyllum lanceolatum* R.S.Rogers = Prasophyllum triangulare – dark leek orchid (W.A.)
- Prasophyllum laxum R.J.Bates – lax leek orchid (S.A.)
- Prasophyllum limnetes D.L.Jones – marsh leek orchid (Tas.)
- Prasophyllum lindleyanum Rchb.f. – green leek orchid (N.S.W., Vic., Tas.)
- Prasophyllum litorale R.J.Bates – coastal leek orchid (S.A., Vic.)
- Prasophyllum maccannii D.L.Jones & D.T.Rouse – inland leek orchid (Vic.)
- Prasophyllum macrostachyum R.Br. – laughing leek orchid (W.A.)
- Prasophyllum macrotys Lindl. – inland leek orchid (W.A.)
- Prasophyllum milfordense D.L.Jones (Tas.)
- Prasophyllum mimulum D.L.Jones – highland leek orchid (Tas.)
- Prasophyllum mollissimum* Rupp = Genoplesium woollsii (F.Muell.) D.L.Jones & M.A.Clem. – dark midge orchid (N.S.W.)
- Prasophyllum montanum R.J.Bates & D.L.Jones – mountain leek orchid (N.S.W., A.C.T., Vic.)
- Prasophyllum morganii Nicholls – Cobungra leek orchid (Vic.)
- Prasophyllum murfetii D.L.Jones – Fleurieu leek orchid (S.A.)
- Prasophyllum nichollsianum* Rupp = Genoplesium nudiscapum (Hook.f.) D.L.Jones & M.A.Clem. – bare midge orchid (Tas.)
- Prasophyllum niphopedium D.L.Jones – marsh leek orchid (Vic.)
- Prasophyllum nitidum D.L.Jones & R.J.Bates – shining leek orchid (Vic., S.A.)
- Prasophyllum nublingii R.S.Rogers* = Genoplesium filiforme (Fitzg.) D.L.Jones & M.A.Clem. – glandular midge orchid (Qld., N.S.W.)
- Prasophyllum obovatum Rupp* = Genoplesium rufum (R.Br.) D.L.Jones & M.A.Clem. – rufous midge orchid (N.S.W.)
- Prasophyllum occidentale R.S.Rogers – plains leek orchid (S.A., Vic.)
- Prasophyllum occultans R.J.Bates – hidden leek orchid (S.A.)
- Prasophyllum odoratissimum D.L.Jones – scented leek orchid, fragrant leek orchid (W.A.)
- Prasophyllum odoratum R.S.Rogers – fragrant leek orchid, Rogers scented leek orchid, sweet leek orchid (N.S.W., Vic.)
- Prasophyllum olidum D.L.Jones – pungent leek orchid (Tas.)
- Prasophyllum ovale Lindl. – little leek orchid (W.A.)
- Prasophyllum pallens D.L.Jones – musty leek orchid (N.S.W.)
- Prasophyllum pallidum Nicholls – pale leek orchid (S.A.)
- Prasophyllum parviflorum (R.S.Rogers) Nicholls – slender leek orchid (Vic.)
- Prasophyllum parvifolium Lindl. – autumn leek orchid (W.A.)
- Prasophyllum patens R.Br. – sandstone leek orchid, broad-lipped leek orchid (N.S.W.)
- Prasophyllum paulinae D.L.Jones & M.A.Clem. – Pauline's leek orchid (W.A.)
- Prasophyllum perangustum D.L.Jones – Knocklofty leek orchid (Tas.)
- Prasophyllum petilum D.L.Jones & R.J.Bates – Tarengo leek orchid (N.S.W., A.C.T.)
- Prasophyllum pictum D.L.Jones & L.M.Copel. (N.S.W.)
- Prasophyllum pilligaense D.L.Jones & L.M.Copel. (N.S.W.)
- Prasophyllum plumiforme Fitzg. – dainty leek orchid (W.A.)
- Prasophyllum praecox D.L.Jones – early leek orchid (S.A.)
- Prasophyllum pruinosum R.S.Rogers – plum leek orchid (S.A.)
- Prasophyllum pulchellum D.L.Jones – pretty leek orchid (Tas.)
- Prasophyllum pyriforme E.Coleman – graceful leek orchid (Vic., N.S.W.)
- Prasophyllum readii D.L.Jones & D.T.Rouse – Streatham leek orchid (Vic.)
- Prasophyllum reflexum* Fitzg. = Genoplesium woollsii (F.Muell.) D.L.Jones & M.A.Clem. – dark midge orchid (N.S.W.)
- Prasophyllum regium R.S.Rogers – king leek orchid (W.A.)
- Prasophyllum retroflexum D.L.Jones (N.S.W., Vic.) - congested leek orchid
- Prasophyllum ringens (Rchb.F.) R.J.Bates (W.A., S.A.)
- Prasophyllum robustum (Nicholls) M.A.Clem. & D.L.Jones – robust leek orchid (Tas.)
- Prasophyllum rogersii Rupp – Barrington Tops leek orchid (N.S.W.)
- Prasophyllum roseum D.L.Jones & R.J.Bates – pink lip leek orchid (Vic., S.A.)
- Prasophyllum rostratum Lindl. – slaty leek orchid (Tas.)
- Prasophyllum rousei D.L.Jones & R.J.Bates (Vic.)
- Prasophyllum sandrae D.L.Jones (N.S.W.)
- Prasophyllum sargentii (Nicholls) A.S.George – frilled leek orchid (W.A.)
- Prasophyllum secutum D.L.Jones – northern leek orchid (Tas.)
- Prasophyllum solstitium D.L.Jones (N.S.W.)
- Prasophyllum spadiceum D.L.Jones & R.J.Bates - brown lip leek orchid (S.A., Vic.)
- Prasophyllum sphacelatum D.L.Jones – subalpine leek orchid (N.S.W., Vic., Tas.)
- Prasophyllum spicatum R.J.Bates & D.L.Jones – dense leek orchid (S.A., Vic.)
- Prasophyllum stellatum D.L.Jones – Ben Lomond leek orchid (Tas.)
- Prasophyllum striatum R.Br. – streaked leek orchid (N.S.W.)
- Prasophyllum stygium D.L.Jones & D.T.Rouse – elfin leek orchid (Vic.)
- Prasophyllum suaveolens D.L.Jones & R.J.Bates – fragrant leek orchid (Vic.)
- Prasophyllum subbisectum Nicholls – Pomonal leek orchid (Vic.)
- Prasophyllum suttonii R.S.Rogers & B.Rees – Mount Buffalo leek orchid, mauve leek orchid (N.S.W., Vic.)
- Prasophyllum sylvestre R.J.Bates & D.L.Jones – forest leek orchid (Vic., N.S.W.)
- Prasophyllum sylvicola D.L.Jones (Vic.)
- Prasophyllum tadgellianum R.S.Rogers** – Tadgell's leek orchid, alpine leek orchid (N.S.W., A.C.T., Vic., Tas.)
- Prasophyllum taphanyx D.L.Jones - graveside leek orchid (Tas.)
- Prasophyllum tortilis D.L.Jones & R.J.Bates (S.A.)
- Prasophyllum transversum* Fitzg. = Genoplesium nudum (Hook.f.) D.L.Jones & M.A.Clem. – tiny midge orchid, red midge orchid (N.S.W., Vic., Tas., N.Z.)
- Prasophyllum triangulare Fitzg. – dark leek orchid (W.A.)
- Prasophyllum truncatum Lindl. – truncate leek orchid (Tas.)
- Prasophyllum tunbridgense D.L.Jones – Tunbridge leek orchid (Tas.)
- Prasophyllum unicum* Rupp = Genoplesium rufum (R.Br.) D.L.Jones & M.A.Clem. – red midge orchid (N.S.W.)
- Prasophyllum uvidulum D.L.Jones & D.T.Rouse – summer leek orchid (Vic.)
- Prasophyllum validum R.S.Rogers – Mount Remarkable leek orchid (S.A.)
- Prasophyllum venustum D.L.Jones & D.T.Rouse (N.S.W.)
- Prasophyllum viretrum D.L.Jones & D.T.Rouse (Vic.)
- Prasophyllum viriosum D.L.Jones & D.T.Rouse (N.S.W.)
- Prasophyllum wallum R.J.Bates & D.L.Jones – wallum leek orchid (Qld.)
- Prasophyllum wilkinsoniorum D.L.Jones (N.S.W.)
