= Prasophyllum taphanyx =

Graveside leek orchid

Conservation status
- Critically endangered (EPBC Act)

Scientific classification
- Kingdom: Plantae
- Clade: Tracheophytes
- Clade: Angiosperms
- Clade: Monocots
- Order: Asparagales
- Family: Orchidaceae
- Subfamily: Orchidoideae
- Tribe: Diurideae
- Subtribe: Prasophyllinae
- Genus: Prasophyllum
- Species: P. taphanyx

Binomial name
- Prasophyllum taphanyx D.L.Jones

Species of orchid

Prasophyllum taphanyx, commonly known as the graveside leek orchid, is a species of orchid endemic to a small area of Tasmania. It has a single tubular, green leaf and up to twenty five small, light green, pinkish-cream and purplish flowers. It rarely flowers and the largest number of flowers seen in any one year was three in 2001.

== Description ==
Prasophyllum taphanyx is a terrestrial, perennial, deciduous, herb with an underground tuber and a single tube-shaped leaf which is 200–300 mm (8–10 in) long and 3–5 mm (0.1–0.2 in) wide. Between fifteen and twenty five light green, pinkish-cream and purplish flowers are crowded along a flowering spike which is 50–65 mm (2–3 in) long reaching to a height of 230–330 mm (9–10 in). The flowers are 7–8 mm (0.28–0.31 in) long and 5–6 mm (0.20–0.24 in) wide and as with other leek orchids, are inverted so that the labellum is above the column rather than below it. The dorsal sepal is about 4 mm (0.2 in) long and 2.5 mm (0.1 in) wide. The lateral sepals are about 4 mm (0.2 in) long and 1.5 mm (0.06 in) wide and free from each other. The petals are about 3 mm (0.12 in) long, 1 mm (0.04 in) wide and spread widely apart from each other. The labellum is pinkish to purplish, about 3 mm (0.1 in) long and wide, and turns sharply upwards through about 90° near its middle. There is a broad, shiny green callus in the centre of the labellum and extending almost to its tip. Flowering occurs in October and November.

== Taxonomy and naming ==
Prasophyllum taphanyx was first formally described in 2004 by David Jones from a specimen collected in a cemetery in Campbell Town and the description was published in The Orchadian. The specific epithet (taphanyx) is derived from the Ancient Greek words taphos meaning "grave" or "tomb" and antyx meaning "edge" or "rim", reflecting where the species is found and its "perilous predicament".

== Distribution and habitat ==
The graveside leek orchid is only known from three plants in remnant native grassland.

== Conservation ==
This orchid is classed as "Endangered" under the Tasmanian Threatened Species Protection Act 1995 and as Critically Endangered under the Commonwealth Government Environment Protection and Biodiversity Conservation Act 1999 (EPBC) Act. The main threats to the species are its critically small population, land clearing and pasture improvement, inappropriate weed control and grazing, mowing or fire during the flowering period.
