= Prasophyllum argillaceum =

Scientific classification
- Kingdom: Plantae
- Clade: Tracheophytes
- Clade: Angiosperms
- Clade: Monocots
- Order: Asparagales
- Family: Orchidaceae
- Subfamily: Orchidoideae
- Tribe: Diurideae
- Genus: Prasophyllum
- Species: P. argillaceum

Binomial name
- Prasophyllum argillaceum D.L.Jones & D.T.Rouse

Species of orchid

Prasophyllum argillaceum is a species of orchid endemic to Victoria. It has a single dark green leaf and between twenty and forty lightly scented, green to pinkish-brown or reddish-brown flowers with a white or pink labellum, and is only known from a small area in the north-east of the state.

== Description ==
Prasophyllum argillaceum is a terrestrial, perennial, deciduous, herb with an underground tuber and a single dark green leaf 250–400 mm (9.8–15.7 in) long, red to purple and 4–6 mm (0.16–0.24 in) wide at the base. Between ten and forty lightly scented, green to pinkish-brown or reddish-brown flowers are crowded along 80–150 mm (3.1–5.9 in) of a flowering spike 200–450 mm (7.9–17.7 in) tall. As with others in the genus, the flowers are inverted so that the labellum is above the column rather than below it. The dorsal sepal is egg-shaped to lance-shaped and curved downwards, 6.5–8 mm (0.26–0.31 in) long and about 3 mm (0.12 in) wide, the lateral sepals erect and parallel to each other, 6.5–8.5 mm (0.26–0.33 in) long and about 1.8 mm (0.071 in) wide. The petals are upswept, linear, 6–7 mm (0.24–0.28 in) long and about 1.5 mm (0.059 in) wide. The labellum is white or pink, broadly egg-shaped, 4.5–5.5 mm (0.18–0.22 in) long and 2.5–3.0 mm (0.098–0.118 in) wide with a fleshy green, centrally channelled callus. Flowering occurs in September and October.

== Taxonomy and naming ==
Prasophyllum argillaceum was first formally described in 2018 by David Jones and Dean Rouse in Australian Orchid Review from a specimen collected west of Boorhaman in 2000. The specific epithet (argillaceum) means "clayey", referring to the heavy clay soils in which this species grows.

== Distribution and habitat ==
This orchid is only known from remnant grassland and grassy woodland near Wangaratta in north-eastern Victoria .

== Conservation status ==
Prasophyllum argillaceum is listed as "critically endangered" under the Victorian government Flora and Fauna Guarantee Act 1988.
