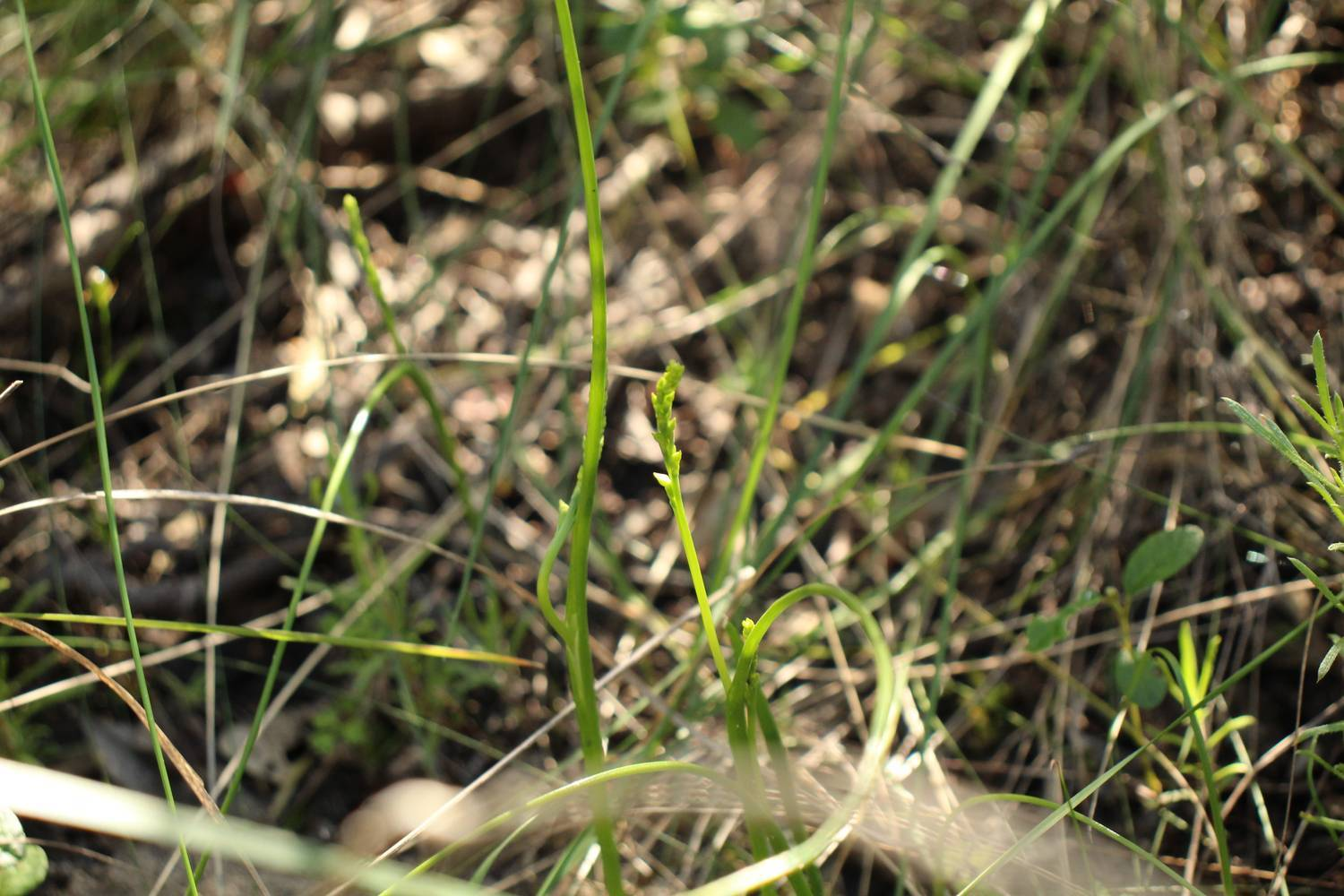
- Near Esperance

Scientific classification
- Kingdom: Plantae
- Clade: Tracheophytes
- Clade: Angiosperms
- Clade: Monocots
- Order: Asparagales
- Family: Orchidaceae
- Subfamily: Orchidoideae
- Tribe: Diurideae
- Genus: Prasophyllum
- Species: P. calcicola

Binomial name
- Prasophyllum calcicola R.J.Bates

= Prasophyllum calcicola =

Limestone leek orchid

Species of plant

Prasophyllum calcicola, commonly known as limestone leek orchid, is a species of orchid endemic to Australia. It has a single, smooth, tube-shaped leaf and up to twelve yellowish-green flowers on an erect flowering stem. It is found in coastal areas of Western Australia and South Australia growing on soils derived from limestone.

== Description ==
Prasophyllum calcicola is a terrestrial, perennial, deciduous, herb with an underground tuber and a single smooth, tube-shaped leaf which is 50–150 mm (2–6 in) long and about 2 mm (0.08 in) in diameter near the reddish base. Between three and twelve or more flowers are arranged on a flowering spike. The flowers are yellowish-green, about 4 mm (0.2 in) long and 3 mm (0.1 in) wide. As with others in the genus, the flowers are inverted so that the labellum is above the column rather than below it. The dorsal sepal is egg-shaped to lance-shaped, about 2 mm (0.08 in) long, 2–3 mm (0.08–0.1 in) wide and green with a red edge. The lateral sepals are lance-shaped, 2–4 mm (0.08–0.2 in) long and joined to each other for about half their length. The petals are triangular in shape, about 2 mm (0.08 in) long and 1 mm (0.04 in) wide. The labellum is 2–3 mm (0.08–0.1 in) long, oblong to lance-shaped and turns upward at 90° about half-way along. Flowering occurs in September and October.

== Taxonomy and naming ==
Prasophyllum calcicola was first formally described in 1989 by Robert Bates and the description was published in Journal of the Adelaide Botanic Garden from a specimen he collected in the Warrenben Conservation Park. The specific epithet (calcicola) is derived from the Latin words calx meaning "limestone" and -cola meaning "dweller", referring to the usual habitat of this species.

== Distribution and habitat ==
The limestone leek orchid grows in coastal areas in calcareous sand and near limestone. It occurs between north of Geraldton and Israelite Bay in Western Australia and in the south-east of South Australia.

== Conservation ==
This orchid is classified as "not threatened" by the Western Australian Government Department of Parks and Wildlife.
