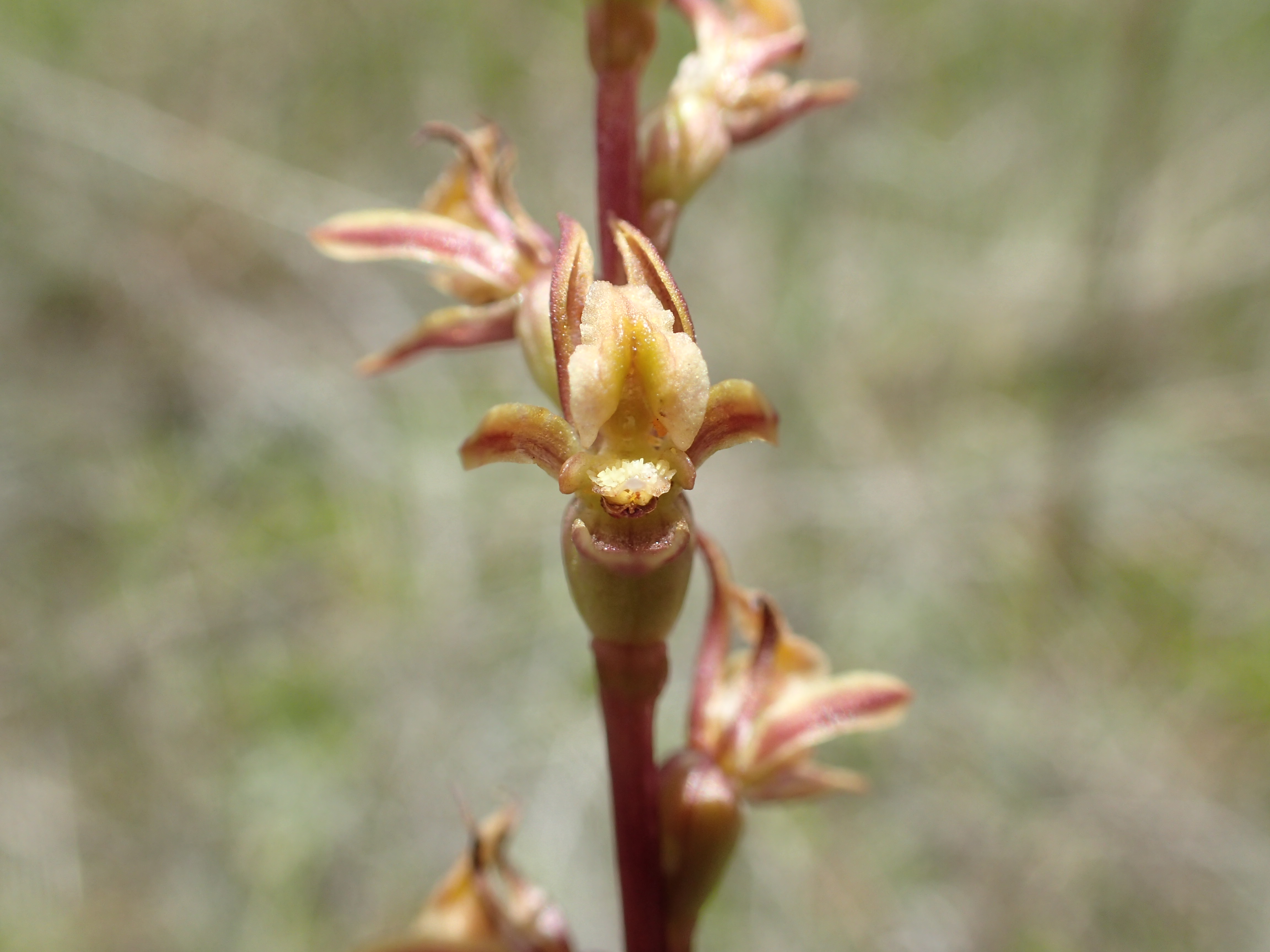
- Near Guyra

Scientific classification
- Kingdom: Plantae
- Clade: Embryophytes
- Clade: Tracheophytes
- Clade: Spermatophytes
- Clade: Angiosperms
- Clade: Monocots
- Order: Asparagales
- Family: Orchidaceae
- Subfamily: Orchidoideae
- Tribe: Diurideae
- Subtribe: Prasophyllinae
- Genus: Prasophyllum
- Species: P. caudiculum

Binomial name
- Prasophyllum caudiculum D.L.Jones

= Prasophyllum caudiculum =

Guyra leek orchid

Species of orchid

Prasophyllum caudiculum, commonly known as the Guyra leek orchid, is a species of orchid endemic to a small area of northern New South Wales. It has a single tubular, bright green leaf and up to thirty five greenish to reddish-brown flowers crowded along an erect flowering stem. It grows in grassy places near Guyra.

== Description ==
Prasophyllum caudiculum is a terrestrial, perennial, deciduous, herb with an underground tuber and a single tube-shaped, bright green leaf, 300–450 mm (12–18 in) long with a reddish-purple base. Between ten and thirty five flowers are crowded along the flowering spike. The flowers are greenish-brown to reddish-brown. As with others in the genus, the flowers are inverted so that the labellum is above the column rather than below it. The dorsal sepal is narrow egg-shaped to lance-shaped, 6–7 mm (0.2–0.3 in) long, about 3 mm (0.1 in) wide and curves downwards. The lateral sepals are linear to lance-shaped, 8–9 mm (0.3–0.4 in) long, about 2 mm (0.08 in) wide and separated from each other. The petals are linear in shape, about 6 mm (0.2 in) long and 1 mm (0.04 in) wide. The labellum is broadly oblong to elliptic, 5–6 mm (0.20–0.24 in) long, about 5 mm (0.2 in) wide and turns upwards at about 90° near its middle, often extending between the lateral sepals. The edge of the labellum flares widely and is wavy near its tip. There is a broad, green, fleshy, channelled callus in the centre of the labellum. Flowering occurs from October to December.

== Taxonomy and naming ==
Prasophyllum caudiculum was first formally described in 2000 by David Jones from a specimen collected near Guyra and the description was published in The Orchadian. The specific epithet (caudiculum) is derived from Latin meaning "a little tail", referring to the narrow labellum mid-lobe.

== Distribution and habitat ==
This leek orchid grows with grasses and herbs on the New England Tableland.
