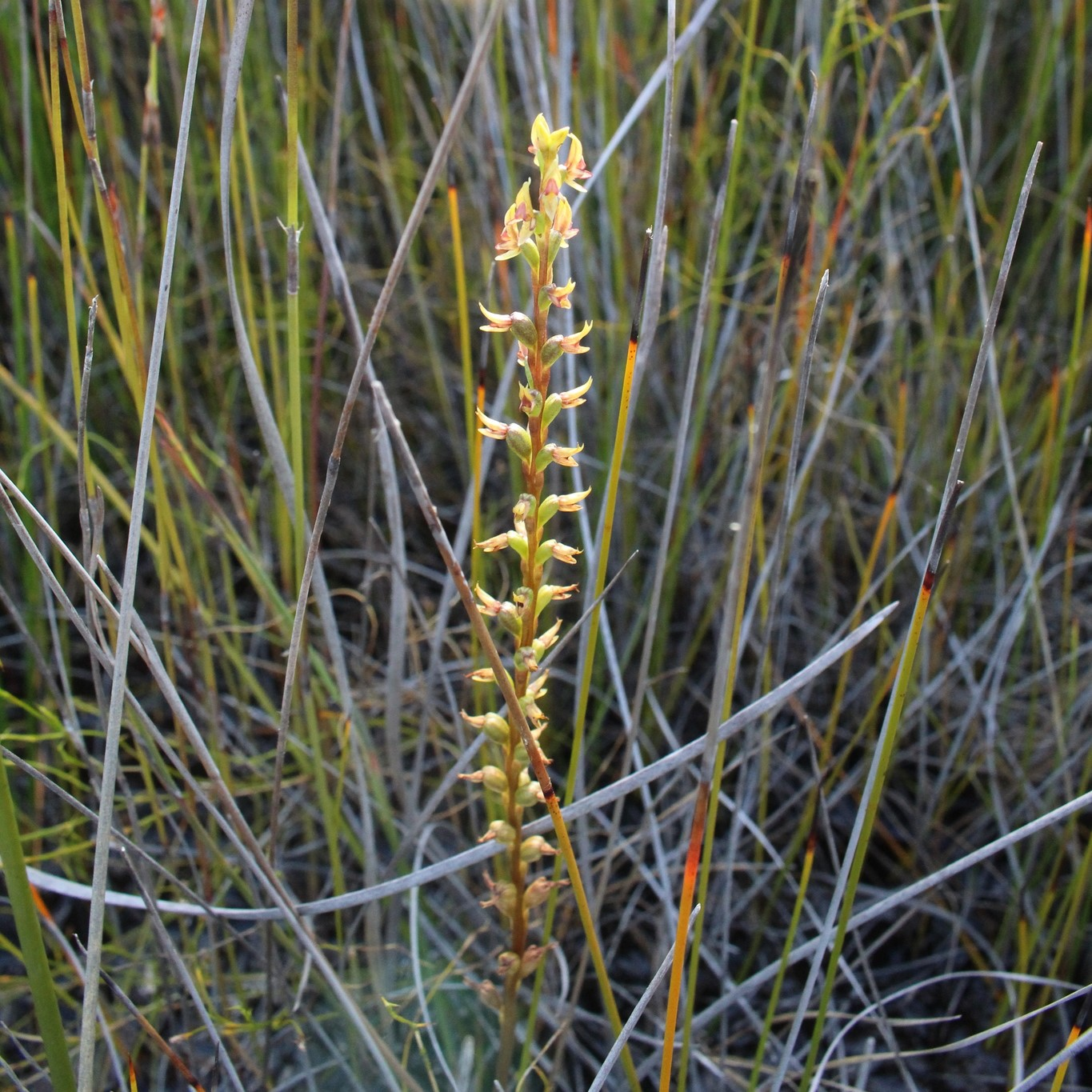

Conservation status
- Priority One — Poorly Known Taxa (DEC)

Scientific classification
- Kingdom: Plantae
- Clade: Tracheophytes
- Clade: Angiosperms
- Clade: Monocots
- Order: Asparagales
- Family: Orchidaceae
- Subfamily: Orchidoideae
- Tribe: Diurideae
- Subtribe: Prasophyllinae
- Genus: Prasophyllum
- Species: P. paulinae

Binomial name
- Prasophyllum paulinae D.L.Jones and M.A.Clem.

= Prasophyllum paulinae =

Pauline's leek orchid

Species of orchid

Prasophyllum paulinae, commonly known as Pauline's leek orchid, is a species of orchid endemic to the south-west of Western Australia. It is a small, rare leek orchid with a single smooth, tubular leaf and up to seventy yellowish-green and purple flowers.

== Description ==
Prasophyllum paulinae is a terrestrial, perennial, deciduous, herb with an underground tuber and a single smooth dark green, tube-shaped leaf with a whitish base and 100–180 mm (4–7 in) long and 4–5 mm (0.16–0.20 in) in diameter. Between twenty five and seventy flowers are arranged on a flowering stem 80–250 mm (3–10 in) long reaching to a height of 150–400 mm (6–20 in). The flowers are greenish-yellow and purple, about 6 mm (0.2 in) long and 4 mm (0.2 in) wide. As with others in the genus, the flowers are inverted so that the labellum is above the column rather than below it. The dorsal sepal is about 4 mm (0.2 in) long and 2 mm (0.08 in) wide and the lateral sepals are about 4 mm (0.2 in) long and 1–1.5 mm (0.04–0.06 in) wide and fused at their bases but with elongated tips. The petals are about 3 mm (0.1 in) long and 1 mm (0.04 in) wide and turn forwards. The labellum has reddish or purplish markings and is about 5 mm (0.2 in) long, 4 mm (0.2 in) wide and turns sharply upwards near its middle. The edges of the labellum are reddish and crinkled and there is a dark callus in its centre, extending almost to the tip. Flowering occurs from September to November and is enhanced by fires the previous summer.

== Taxonomy and naming ==
Prasophyllum paulinae was first formally described in 1996 by David Jones and Mark Clements and the description was published in Nuytsia. The specific epithet (paulinae) honours Pauline Heberle.

== Distribution and habitat ==
Pauline's leek orchid grows with grasses and sedges in swamps near Albany in the Jarrah Forest biogeographic region.

== Conservation ==
Prasophyllum paulinae is classified as "Priority One" by the Government of Western Australia Department of Parks and Wildlife meaning that it is known from only one or a few locations which are potentially at risk.
