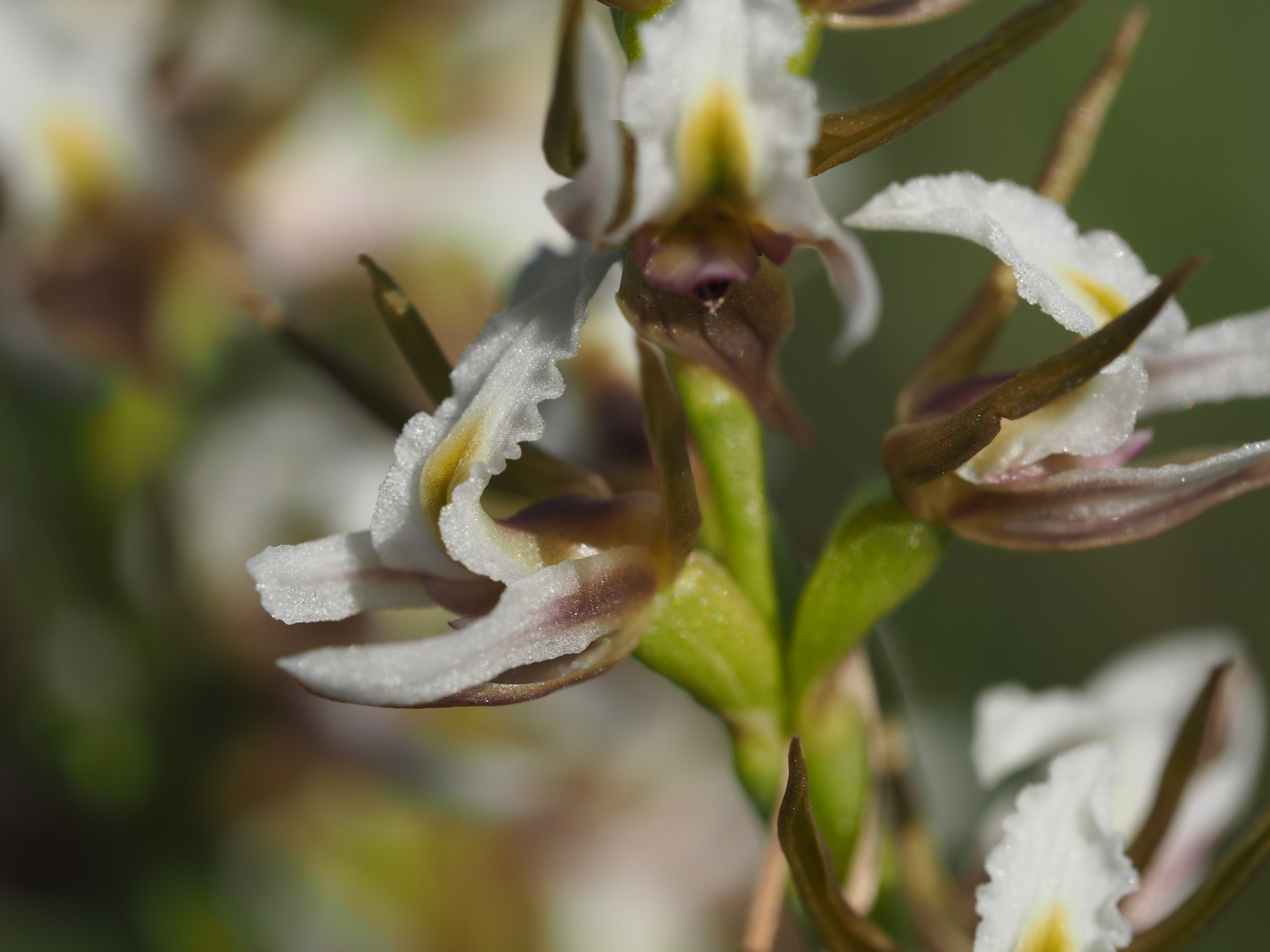
- East of Guyra

Scientific classification
- Kingdom: Plantae
- Clade: Embryophytes
- Clade: Tracheophytes
- Clade: Spermatophytes
- Clade: Angiosperms
- Clade: Monocots
- Order: Asparagales
- Family: Orchidaceae
- Subfamily: Orchidoideae
- Tribe: Diurideae
- Subtribe: Prasophyllinae
- Genus: Prasophyllum
- Species: P. dossenum

Binomial name
- Prasophyllum dossenum D.L.Jones

Synonyms
- Paraprasophyllum dossenum (R.J.Bates & D.L.Jones) M.A.Clem. & D.L.Jones

= Prasophyllum dossenum =

Species of orchid

Prasophyllum dossenum is a species of orchid endemic to a small area of northern New South Wales. It has a single tubular, dark green leaf and up to thirty scented pinkish-white and greenish-brown flowers crowded along an erect flowering stem. It is a rare orchid which grows in grassy places on the Northern Tablelands of New South Wales.

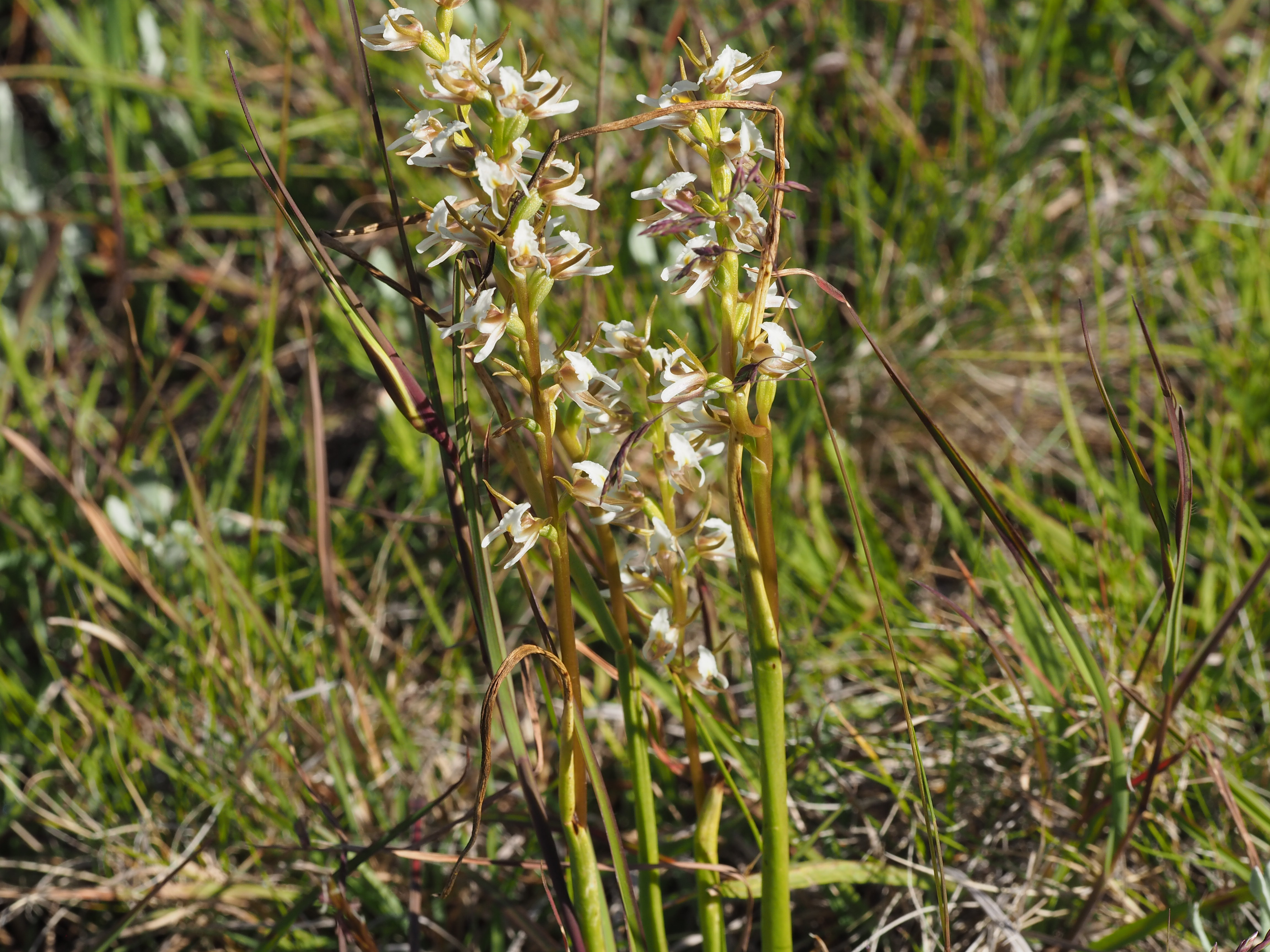
Habit

== Description ==
Prasophyllum dossenum is a terrestrial, perennial, deciduous, herb with an underground tuber and which grows to a height of 200–500 mm (8–20 in). It has a single tube-shaped, dark green leaf 200–400 mm (8–20 in) long and 5–10 mm (0.2–0.4 in) wide with a reddish base. Between five and thirty flowers are crowded along a flowering spike 30–80 mm (1–3 in) long. The flowers are scented, pinkish-white and greenish-brown. As with others in the genus, the flowers are inverted so that the labellum is above the column rather than below it. The dorsal sepal is egg-shaped to lance-shaped, 7–11 mm (0.3–0.4 in) long, 4–5 mm (0.16–0.20 in) wide, dark brown on the lower surface and has three stripes on the upper surface. The lateral sepals are linear to lance-shaped, dark purplish-brown, 7–11 mm (0.3–0.4 in) long and about 2.5 mm (0.1 in) wide with a swollen base then joined for part of their length but with free tips. The petals are linear to lance-shaped, 8–10 mm (0.3–0.4 in) long, about 3 mm (0.1 in) wide and spread widely apart from each other. The labellum is egg-shaped, 9–12 mm (0.4–0.5 in) long, 5–6 mm (0.20–0.24 in) wide, swollen near the base and turns upwards at about 90° near its middle. The edge of the labellum flares widely and is wavy near its tip. There is a fleshy, yellowish-green, channelled callus in the centre of the labellum. Flowering occurs from November to January and the flowers remain open for up to two weeks.

== Taxonomy and naming ==
Prasophyllum dossenum was first formally described in 1991 by David Jones from a specimen collected near Guyra and the description was published in Australian Orchid Research. The specific epithet (dossenum) is a Latin word meaning "hunchback" or "humpback", referring to the swollen lateral sepals.

== Distribution and habitat ==
This leek orchid grows in grassy places at altitudes higher than 800 m (3,000 ft) on the New England Tableland.
