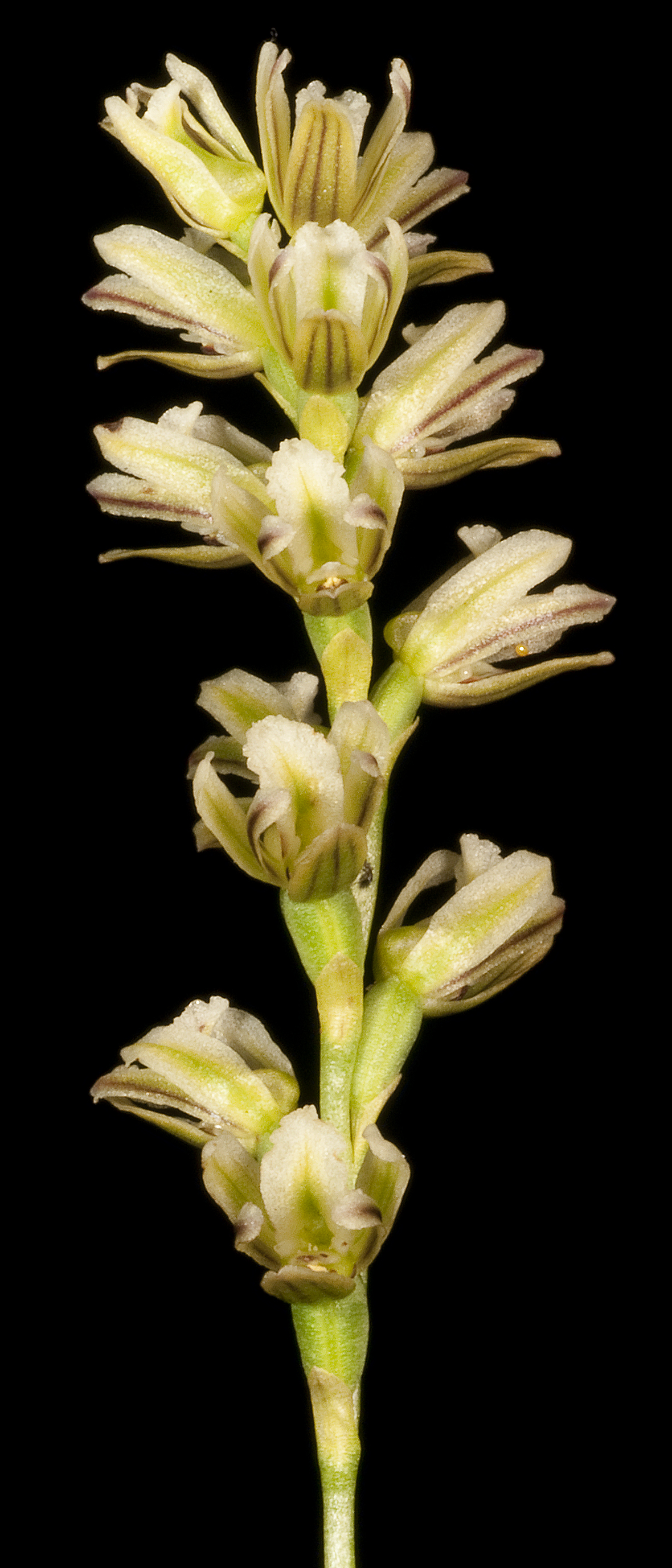

Scientific classification
- Kingdom: Plantae
- Clade: Tracheophytes
- Clade: Angiosperms
- Clade: Monocots
- Order: Asparagales
- Family: Orchidaceae
- Subfamily: Orchidoideae
- Tribe: Diurideae
- Subtribe: Prasophyllinae
- Genus: Prasophyllum
- Species: P. cyphochilum

Binomial name
- Prasophyllum cyphochilum Benth.

Synonyms
- Paraprasophyllum cyphochilum (Benth.) M.A.Clem. & D.L.Jones

= Prasophyllum cyphochilum =

Pouched leek orchid

Species of orchid

Prasophyllum cyphochilum, commonly known as pouched leek orchid, is a species of orchid endemic to the south-west of Western Australia. It is a relatively common orchid with a single smooth, tubular leaf and up to thirty or more pale yellow and brown flowers. The flowers do not open fully, are more or less cup-shaped and have a "humped" labellum.

== Description ==
Prasophyllum cyphochilum is a terrestrial, perennial, deciduous, herb with an underground tuber and a single smooth, tube-shaped leaf 60–250 mm (2–10 in) long and about 2 mm (0.08 in) in diameter. Between fifteen and thirty or more flowers are arranged on a flowering spike 150–450 mm (6–20 in) tall. The flowers are pale yellow and brown, about 8 mm (0.3 in) long and 7 mm (0.3 in) wide. As with others in the genus, the flowers are inverted so that the labellum is above the column rather than below it. The dorsal sepal, lateral sepals and petals are small and forwards-facing, so that the flower is cup-shaped and does not fully open. The labellum is also small, turns upwards towards the lateral sepals and has a humped or pouched base. Flowering occurs from September to October.

== Taxonomy and naming ==
Prasophyllum cyphochilum was first formally described in 1873 by George Bentham and the description was published in Flora Australiensis. The specific epithet (cyphochilum) is derived from the Ancient Greek words kyphos meaning "bent" or "humped" and cheilos meaning "lip" referring to the humped base of the labellum.

== Distribution and habitat ==
Pouched leek orchid grows amongst shrubs in places that are wet in winter. It occurs from Kalbarri in the north to Israelite Bay in the east.

== Conservation ==
Prasophyllum cyphochilum is classified as "not threatened" by the Western Australian Government Department of Parks and Wildlife.
