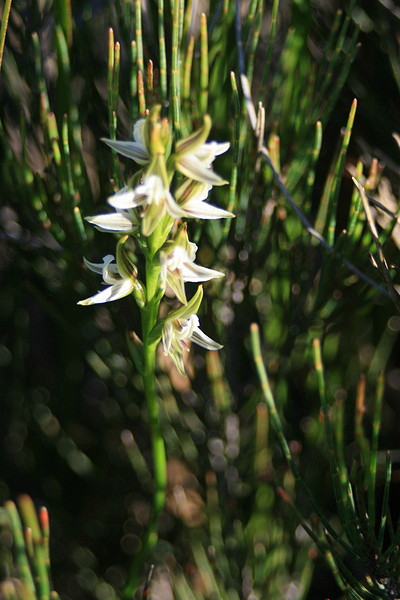
- Near Blackheath

Scientific classification
- Kingdom: Plantae
- Clade: Embryophytes
- Clade: Tracheophytes
- Clade: Spermatophytes
- Clade: Angiosperms
- Clade: Monocots
- Order: Asparagales
- Family: Orchidaceae
- Subfamily: Orchidoideae
- Tribe: Diurideae
- Subtribe: Prasophyllinae
- Genus: Prasophyllum
- Species: P. parvifolium

Binomial name
- Prasophyllum parvifolium R.Br.

Synonyms
- Mecopodum striatum (R.Br.) D.L.Jones & M.A.Clem.

= Prasophyllum striatum =

Streaked leek orchid

Species of orchid

Prasophyllum striatum, commonly known as streaked leek orchid, is a species of orchid endemic to New South Wales. It has a single thin, tube-shaped leaf and up to ten greenish and whitish flowers with reddish or purplish stripes. It differs from other leek orchids in having a very thin leaf and prominently streaked flowers.

== Description ==
Prasophyllum striatum is a terrestrial, perennial, deciduous, herb with an underground tuber and a single tube-shaped leaf 70–200 mm (3–8 in) long and about 0.5–1 mm (0.02–0.04 in) in diameter. The free part of the leaf is 25–70 mm (1–3 in) long. Up to ten flowers are arranged on a flowering spike 10–50 mm (0.4–2 in) high. The flowers are 7–8 mm (0.28–0.31 in) long and 4–5 mm (0.16–0.20 in) wide on a short, thin ovary, and as with other leek orchids, are inverted so that the labellum is above the column rather than below it. The dorsal sepal is triangular, greenish with reddish or purplish stripes and is 8–10 mm (0.3–0.4 in) long and about 4 mm (0.2 in) wide. The lateral sepals are a similar size and colour to the dorsal sepal, fused to each other and curve backwards. The petals are whitish with reddish or purplish stripes and are about 8 mm (0.3 in) long and 3 mm (0.1 in) wide. The labellum is white, about 7 mm (0.3 in) long and 3 mm (0.1 in) wide. It curves gently upwards and has wavy edges. There is a raised, creamy-white callus with two parallel ridges in the centre of the labellum and extending almost to its tip. Flowering occurs from March to June.

== Taxonomy and naming ==
Prasophyllum striatum was first formally described in 1810 by Robert Brown and the description was published in Prodromus Florae Novae Hollandiae et Insulae Van Diemen. The specific epithet (striatum) is a Latin word meaning "furrowed", "channelled" or "striped".

In 2004 David Jones and Mark Clements proposed changing the name to Mecopodum striatum but the name has not been accepted by the World Checklist of Selected Plant Families.

== Distribution and habitat ==
Striated leek orchid grows in shallow soil on sandstone and near swamps mainly near the coast from Bulahdelah to Nowra but also in the Blue Mountains.
