= Prasophyllum stygium =

Elfin leek orchid

Scientific classification
- Kingdom: Plantae
- Clade: Tracheophytes
- Clade: Angiosperms
- Clade: Monocots
- Order: Asparagales
- Family: Orchidaceae
- Subfamily: Orchidoideae
- Tribe: Diurideae
- Subtribe: Prasophyllinae
- Genus: Prasophyllum
- Species: P. stygium

Binomial name
- Prasophyllum stygium D.L.Jones & D.T.Rouse

Species of orchid

Prasophyllum stygium, commonly known as the elfin leek orchid, is a species of orchid endemic to Victoria. It has a single tube-shaped leaf and up to twenty greenish-brown flowers with a white labellum. It is a recently described plant, previously included with P. fitzgeraldii, but distinguished from that species by its greenish-brown flowers with their white labellum and narrower brown callus. It is only known from a single population of about thirty plants.

== Description ==
Prasophyllum stygium is a terrestrial, perennial, deciduous, herb with an underground tuber and a single tube-shaped, shiny, pale green leaf which is 150–200 mm (6–8 in) long and 2–4 mm (0.08–0.2 in) wide at its maroon base. Between eight and twenty greenish-brown flowers are arranged along a flowering spike 50–80 mm (2–3 in) long, reaching to a height of 180–260 mm (7–10 in). The flowers are 9–12 mm (0.4–0.5 in) long and 6–8 mm (0.2–0.3 in) wide. As with others in the genus, the flowers are inverted so that the labellum is above the column rather than below it. The dorsal sepal is lance-shaped to egg-shaped, 5–6 mm (0.20–0.24 in) long and about 2.5 mm (0.1 in) wide. The lateral sepals are egg-shaped to lance-shaped, 5–7 mm (0.2–0.3 in) long, 1–1.5 mm (0.04–0.06 in) wide and free from each other. The petals are brownish-green with whitish edges, linear to oblong, 5–6 mm (0.20–0.24 in) long and 1–1.5 mm (0.04–0.06 in) wide. The labellum is white, lance-shaped to egg-shaped, 4–5 mm (0.16–0.20 in) long, 2–2.5 mm (0.08–0.1 in) wide and turns sharply upward at 90° about half-way along, reaching the lateral sepals. The edges of the upturned part are wavy or crinkled with hair-like papillae. There is a raised, oblong, coffee-coloured callus in the centre of the labellum and extending almost to its tip. Flowering occurs in late October or early November and only lasts a few days.

== Taxonomy and naming ==
Prasophyllum stygium was first formally described in 2017 by David Jones and Dean Rouse and the description was published in Australian Orchid Review from a specimen collected in the Deep Lead Nature Conservation Reserve near Stawell. The specific epithet (stygium) is a Latin word meaning "stygian" after the mythological river Styx, referring to the type location, a former mining area where gold was extracted from buried river beds.

== Distribution and habitat ==
The elfin leek orchid is only known from about thirty plants growing in forest at the type location.
