= Prasophyllum crassum =

Scientific classification
- Kingdom: Plantae
- Clade: Tracheophytes
- Clade: Angiosperms
- Clade: Monocots
- Order: Asparagales
- Family: Orchidaceae
- Subfamily: Orchidoideae
- Tribe: Diurideae
- Subtribe: Prasophyllinae
- Genus: Prasophyllum
- Species: P. crassum

Binomial name
- Prasophyllum crassum D.L.Jones & R.J.Bates

Species of plant

Prasophyllum crassum is a species of orchid endemic to South Australia. It has a single tube-shaped leaf and up to fifteen greenish and pinkish-brown flowers with a whitish labellum. It is a recently described plant, previously included with P. fitzgeraldii, but distinguished from that species by its smaller number of smaller, less colourful flowers and different labellum shape. It grows in the south-east of the state and usually only appears after fire.

== Description ==
Prasophyllum crassum is a terrestrial, perennial, deciduous, herb with an underground tuber and a single tube-shaped, shiny green leaf which is 200–250 mm (8–10 in) long and 5–7 mm (0.2–0.3 in) wide but narrower at the base. Between six and fifteen greenish and pinkish-brown flowers with fleshy petals and sepals are arranged along a flowering spike 30–70 mm (1–3 in) long. The flowers are 7–10 mm (0.3–0.4 in) long and 6–8 mm (0.2–0.3 in) wide. As with others in the genus, the flowers are inverted so that the labellum is above the column rather than below it. The dorsal sepal is lance-shaped to egg-shaped, 7–8 mm (0.28–0.31 in) long and about 3 mm (0.1 in) wide. The lateral sepals are linear to lance-shaped, 6–7 mm (0.24–0.28 in) long, 2–3 mm (0.08–0.1 in) wide and mostly free from each other. The petals are greenish-brown with whitish edges, linear to oblong, 6–8 mm (0.2–0.3 in) long and about 2 mm (0.08 in) wide. The labellum is whitish, oblong to egg-shaped, 7–8 mm (0.28–0.31 in) long, 3–4 mm (0.12–0.16 in) wide and curves upward about half-way along with the tip just reaching between the lateral sepals. The edges of the upturned part are wavy or crinkled with hair-like papillae. There is a raised, claw-like, yellowish brown callus in the centre of the labellum and extending almost to its tip. Flowering occurs in late September and early October.

== Taxonomy and naming ==
Prasophyllum crassum was first formally described in 2017 by David Jones and Robert Bates and the description was published in Australian Orchid Review from a specimen collected in the Desert Camp Conservation Park. The specific epithet (crassum) is a Latin word meaning "thick", "fat" or "stout", referring to the fleshy texture of this orchid.

== Distribution and habitat ==
This leek orchid mostly grows in low lying, winter wet areas in the Big Heath Conservation Park and between Kingston, Mundulla and Frances. It often grows with other species of leek orchid.
