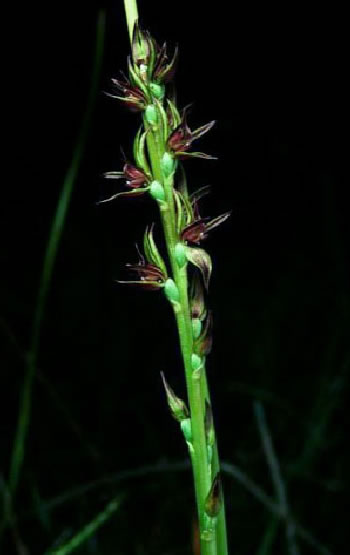

Conservation status
- Vulnerable (EPBC Act)

Scientific classification
- Kingdom: Plantae
- Clade: Embryophytes
- Clade: Tracheophytes
- Clade: Spermatophytes
- Clade: Angiosperms
- Clade: Monocots
- Order: Asparagales
- Family: Orchidaceae
- Subfamily: Orchidoideae
- Tribe: Diurideae
- Subtribe: Prasophyllinae
- Genus: Prasophyllum
- Species: P. fuscum

Binomial name
- Prasophyllum fuscum R.Br.

Synonyms
- Prasophyllum uroglossum Rupp

= Prasophyllum fuscum =

Slaty leek orchid

Species of orchid

Prasophyllum fuscum, commonly known as the slaty leek orchid or tawny leek orchid, is a species of orchid endemic to a small region of New South Wales. It has a single tubular green leaf and up to thirty greenish brown to reddish brown flowers. There is debate about the taxonomy of the species with some authorities considering Prasophyllum uroglossum as a separate species. Only about twenty five plants are known to survive in south-western Sydney.

== Description ==
Prasophyllum fuscum is a terrestrial, perennial, deciduous, herb with an underground tuber and a single tube-shaped leaf 150–400 mm (6–20 in) long and 4–6 mm (0.16–0.24 in) wide at the base. Between ten and thirty scented flowers are arranged along 70–120 mm (3–5 in) of a flowering stem 300–450 mm (10–20 in) tall. The flowers are greenish brown to reddish brown, 9–13 mm (0.4–0.5 in) long, 5–7 mm (0.2–0.3 in) wide and as with others in the genus, are inverted so that the labellum is above the column rather than below it. The dorsal sepal is egg-shaped to lance-shaped, about 9 mm (0.4 in) long, 2 mm (0.08 in) wide and pointed. The lateral sepals are linear to lance-shaped, 8–10 mm (0.3–0.4 in) long, 2 mm (0.079 in) wide and parallel to and free from each other. The petals are linear to oblong, pointed, about 7 mm (0.3 in) long, 1.5 mm (0.06 in) wide and spread widely. The labellum is linear to egg-shaped, 8–9 mm (0.3–0.4 in) long, about 5 mm (0.2 in) wide and turns upwards through about 90° near its middle. The edges of the labellum are slightly crinkled and there is a shiny, raised callus in its centre. Flowering occurs between September and December.

== Taxonomy and naming ==
Prasophyllum fuscum was first formally described in 1810 by Robert Brown from a specimen collected in "moist meadows towards George's River". The description was published in Prodromus Florae Novae Hollandiae et Insulae Van Diemen. The specific epithet (fuscum) is a Latin word meaning "brown". The name has been applied to other species widely distributed throughout south-eastern Australia, including P. pallens, but the species is presently understood to be restricted to an area south-west of Sydney.

== Distribution and habitat ==
The slaty leek orchid is only known from a single population growing on a roadside in the Wilton district. It grows in moist, sandy soil amongst grasses and sedges.

== Conservation ==
Prasophyllum fuscum is listed as "Vulnerable" under the Commonwealth Government Environment Protection and Biodiversity Conservation Act 1999 (EPBC) Act and as "Critically Endangered" under the New South Wales Threatened Species Conservation Act 1995. The total population of the species was estimated in 2007 to be twenty five individuals in an area of 4 km^{2} (2 mi^{2}). The main threats to the population are habitat loss, changes to water quality and weed invasion.
