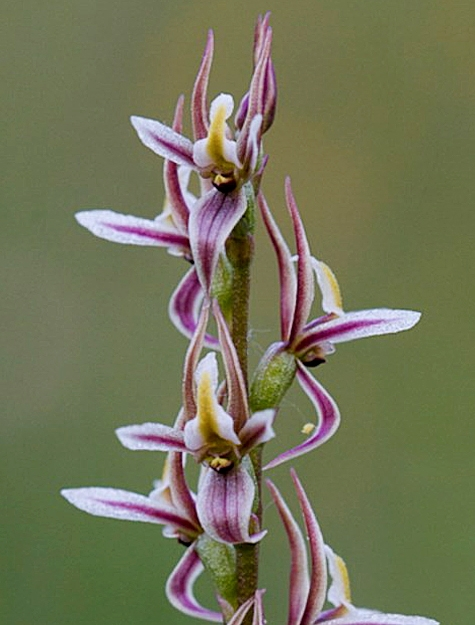
- P. petilum growing in the Australian Capital Territory

Scientific classification
- Kingdom: Plantae
- Clade: Embryophytes
- Clade: Tracheophytes
- Clade: Spermatophytes
- Clade: Angiosperms
- Clade: Monocots
- Order: Asparagales
- Family: Orchidaceae
- Subfamily: Orchidoideae
- Tribe: Diurideae
- Subtribe: Prasophyllinae
- Genus: Prasophyllum; R.Br.

Type species
- Prasophyllum australe R.Br.

Diversity
- About 140 species

Synonyms
- Chiloterus D.L.Jones & M.A.Clem.; Mecopodum D.L.Jones & M.A.Clem.; Paraprasophyllum M.A.Clem. & D.L.Jones; Prasophyllum sect. Euprasophyllum Hook.f. nom. inval.; Prasophyllum R.Br. sect. Prasophyllum; Prosophyllum Dockrill orth. var.

= Prasophyllum =

Leek orchids

Genus of flowering plants

Prasophyllum, commonly known as leek orchids, is a genus of about 140 species of flowering plants in the orchid family, Orchidaceae and is found in Australia and New Zealand. The Australian species are found in all states but have not been recorded in the Northern Territory. The common name arises from their having a hollow, leek- or onion-like leaf. Some species only flower after summer fires and have flowers similar to those of Xanthorrhoea which flower at the same time, suggesting that they employ the same pollinating insects. Leek orchids are similar to those in the genus Genoplesium except that the free part of the leaf is cylindrical (flat in Genoplesium) and the labellum has a solid (rather than flexible) connection to the column. They range in size from the little laughing leek orchid (P. gracile) at about 15 cm (6 in) to the king leek orchid (P. regium) which grows up to 2 m (80 in) tall.

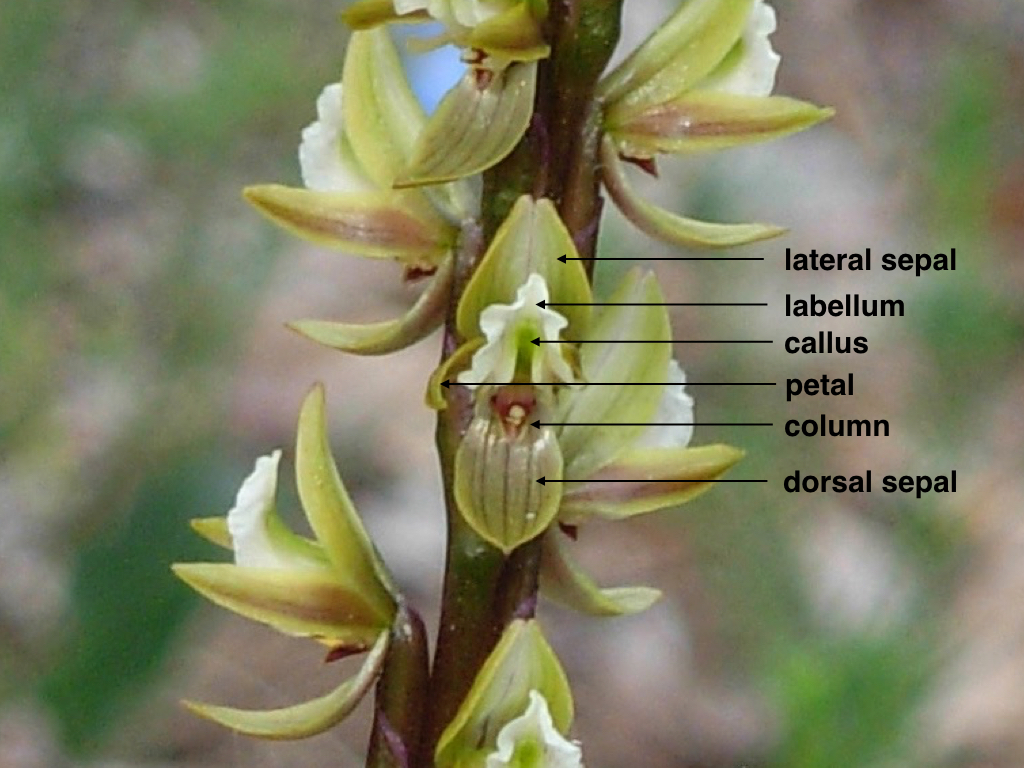
Labelled image of Prasophyllum elatum flower

== Description ==
Orchids in the genus Prasophyllum are terrestrial, perennial, deciduous, sympodial herbs usually with a few inconspicuous, fine roots and a pair of more or less spherical tubers partly covered by a fibrous sheath. Replacement tubers form at the end of short root-like stolons. Leek orchids rarely reproduce by forming "daughter" tubers, relying on their flowers for reproduction. A single onion or leek-like leaf develops near the base of the plant and accounts for the common name of the group. The leaf is long, narrow, hollow, cylindrical and glabrous.

The inflorescence is a spike or raceme with a few to many non-resupinate flowers breaking through a thin part of the leaf. The dorsal sepal is wider than two lateral sepals which are often joined. The petals are often curved, shorter and narrower than the sepals. As is usual in orchids, one petal is highly modified as the central labellum, differing markedly from the other petals and sepals. The labellum is positioned above the column and rigidly attached to its base. Its edges are usually wavy and rolled back. The labellum has a callus which consists of a raised, fleshy plate which is usually channelled, with the base forming an inverted basin shape. The sexual parts of the flower are fused to the column which is short and has narrow wings, often with a small lobe at the front. Leek orchids usually flower between late winter and early summer, depending on species, and the fruit that follows flowering is a non-fleshy, dehiscent capsule containing up to 500 seeds.

== Taxonomy and naming ==
The genus Prasophyllum was first formally described by Robert Brown in 1810 and the description was published in Prodromus Florae Novae Hollandiae. Brown described twelve species but did not name a type species, however in 1989, Mark Clements nominated P. australe as the lectotype.

The name Prasophyllum is derived from the Ancient Greek words prason meaning "leek" and phyllon meaning "leaf".

== Distribution and habitat ==
Leek orchids occur in all states of Australia, but not in the Northern Territory. There are 20 named species in Western Australia as well as a further 40 that have been discovered but not as yet described. There are 28 species in Tasmania, about 40 in New South Wales and 15 in South Australia. New Zealand has about 6 species, occurring on both main islands as well as Stewart and Chatham Islands. In Western Australia alone, they grow in a range of habitats from the margins of salt lakes, to swamps and dense karri (Eucalyptus diversicolor) forests.

== Ecology ==
Prasophyllum species are mycotrophic, requiring symbiotic fungi for seed germination. The main fungus is Ceratobasidium cornigerum.

Many Western Australian species only flower after summer fires and in other years only produce leaves. Most flowers are strongly scented, produce nectar and are pollinated by insects but a few appear able to self-pollinated if not visited. They often have flowers similar to grass trees in the genus Xanthorrhoea, flower under similar conditions and are visited by a similar range of insects, suggesting that they mimic grass tree flowers.

== Species ==
As at October 2025, about 148 species are recognised by the Plants of the World Online. Eight species described in 2017 are not included on the Checklist yet but are included in the International Plant Names Index. They are P. crassum, P. nitidum, P. roseum, P. rousei, P. stygium, P. sylvicola, P. spadiceum and P. tortilis.

=== Species list ===
See List of Prasophyllum species

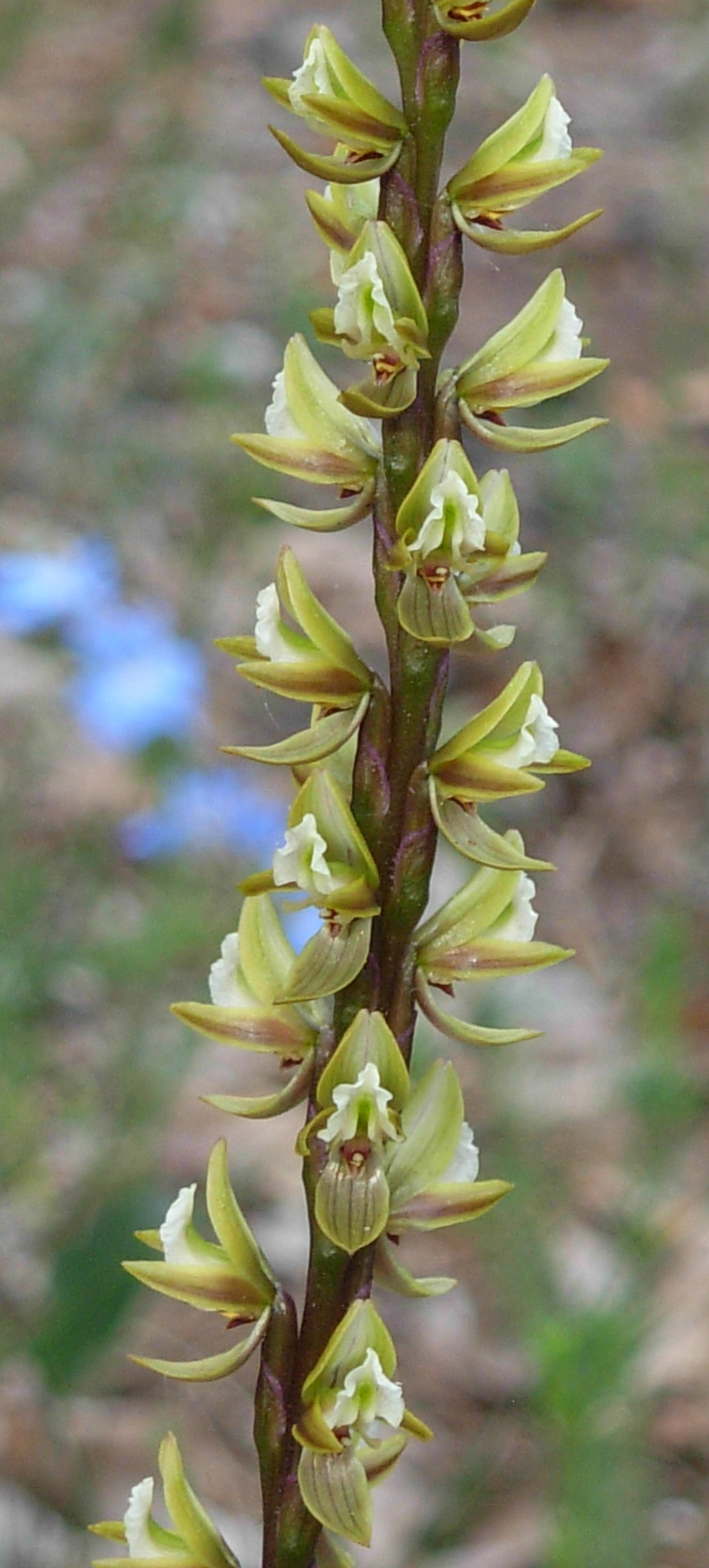
Prasophyllum elatum at the Strettle Road Reserve Glen Forrest in Western Australia

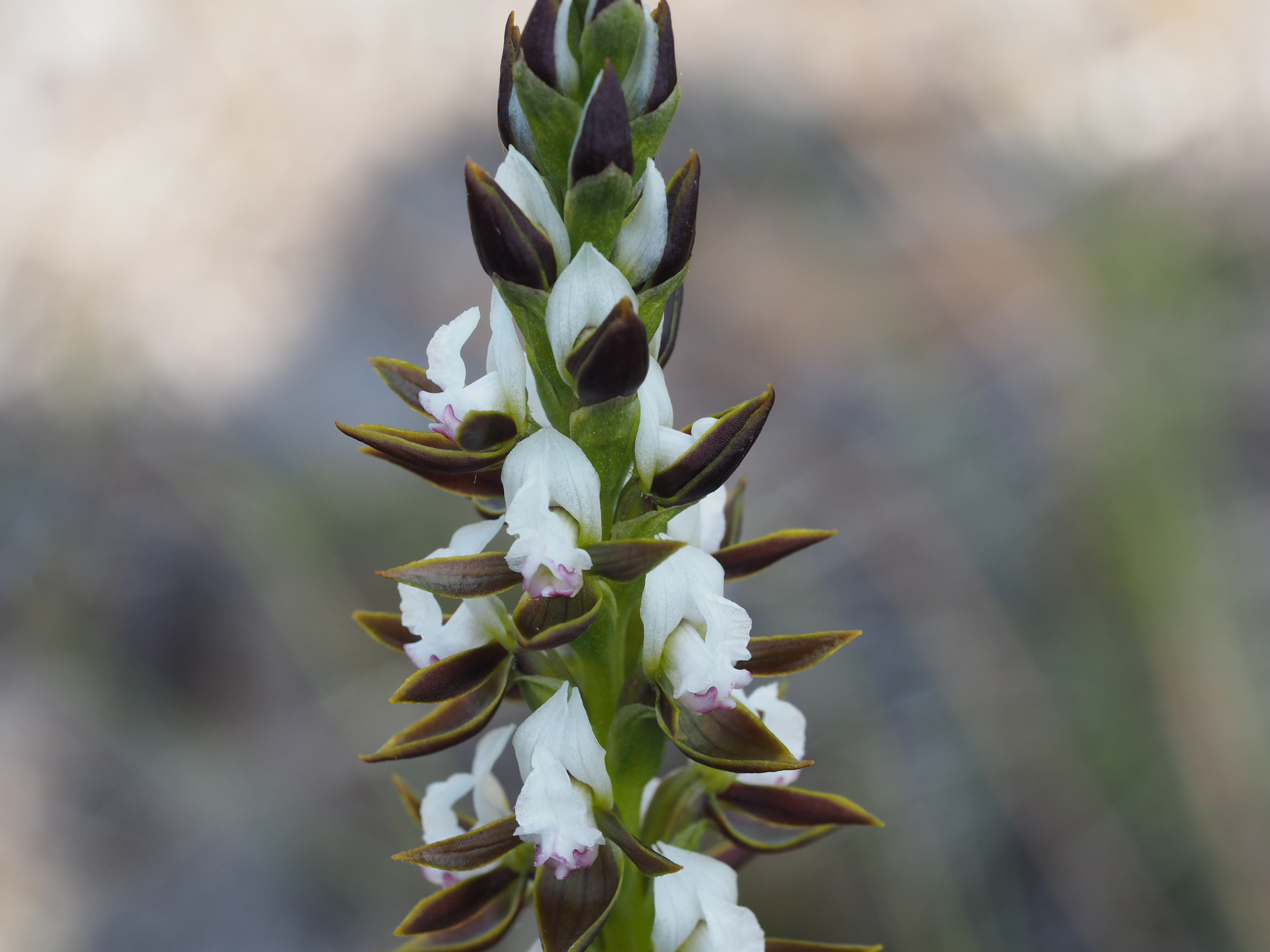
Prasophyllum sargentii growing near Hopetoun Western Australia

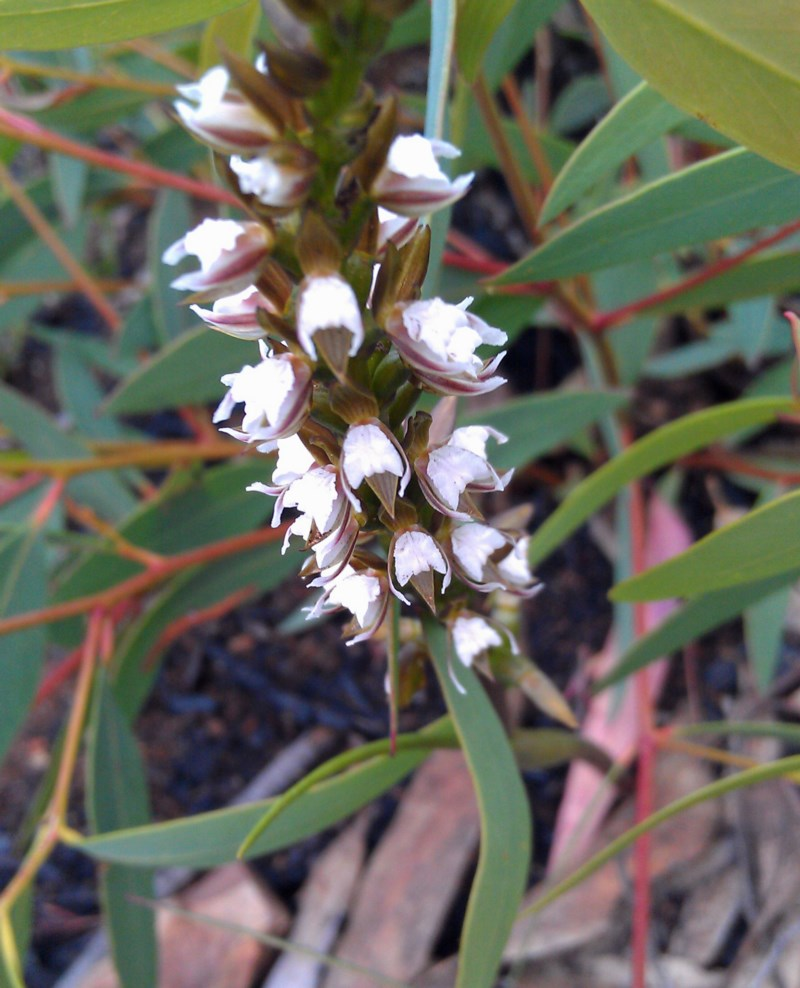
Prasophyllum brevilabre growing on Black Mountain in the Australian Capital Territory

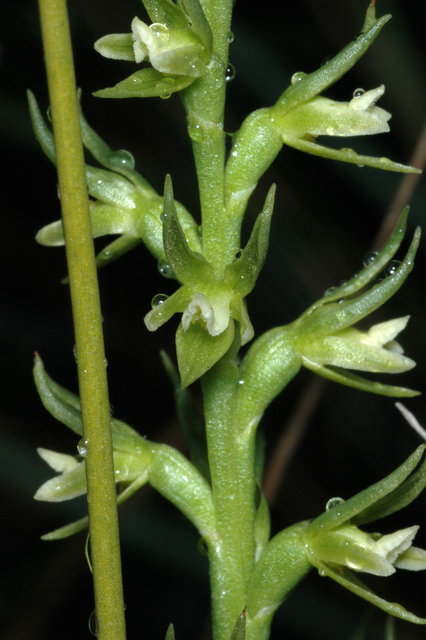
Prasophyllum lindleyanum growing near Melbourne in Victoria

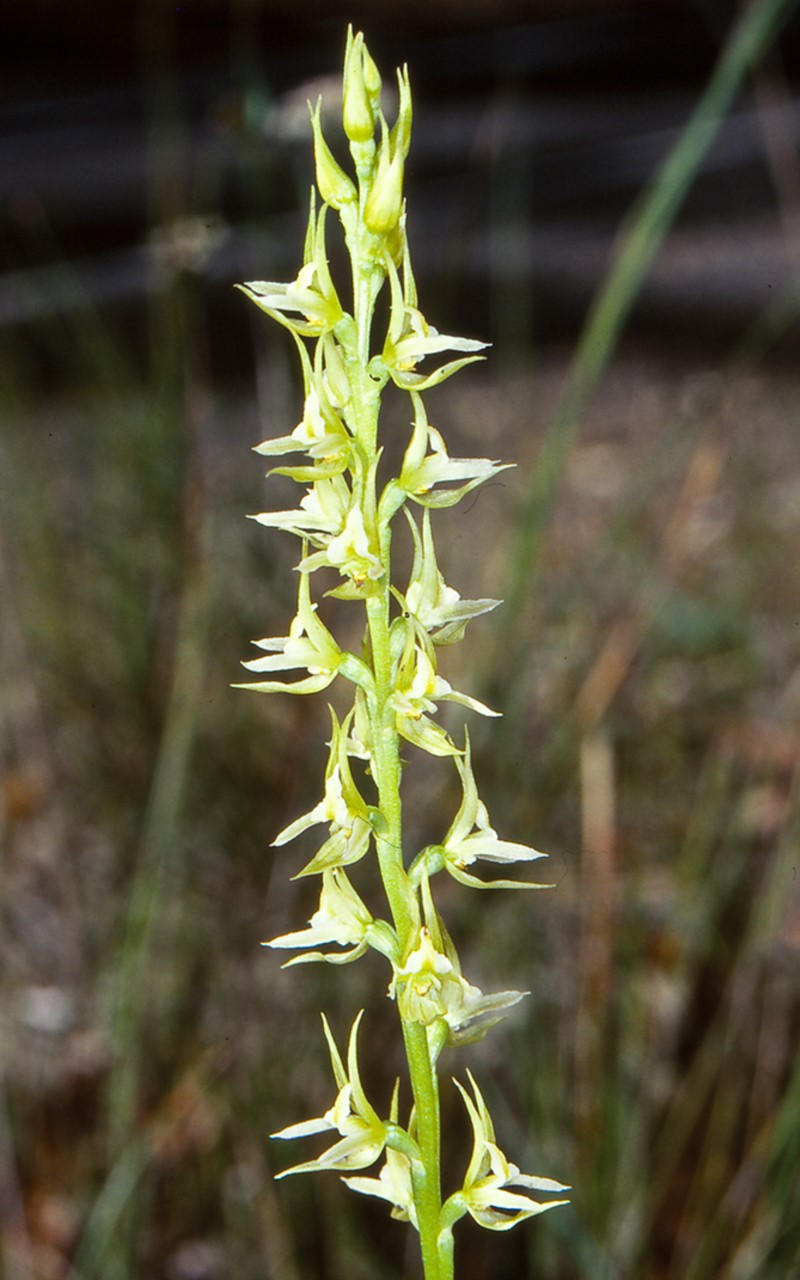
Prasophyllum sylvestre near the Tuross River in New South Wales

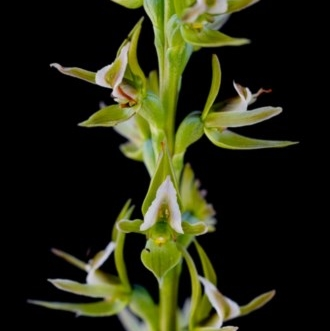
Prasophyllum montanum in the Namadgi National Park in the Australian Capital Territory
