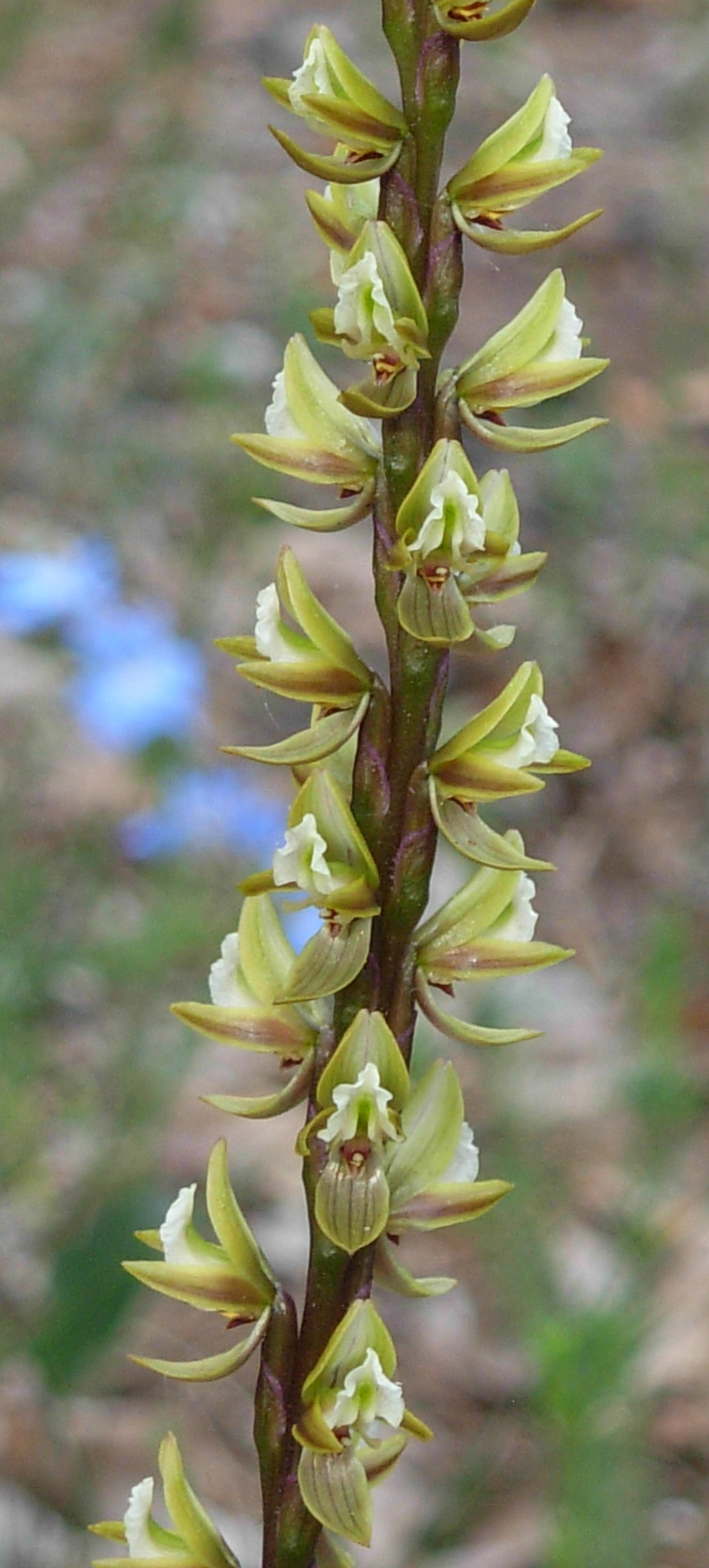
- Prasophyllum elatum flowers at Strettle Road Reserve Glen Forrest, Western Australia

Scientific classification
- Kingdom: Plantae
- Clade: Embryophytes
- Clade: Tracheophytes
- Clade: Spermatophytes
- Clade: Angiosperms
- Clade: Monocots
- Order: Asparagales
- Family: Orchidaceae
- Subfamily: Orchidoideae
- Tribe: Diurideae
- Subtribe: Prasophyllinae; Schltr. Bot. Jahrb. Syst. (1911)

Genera
- Corunastylis; Genoplesium; Microtis; Prasophyllum

= Prasophyllinae =

Subtribe of orchids

Prasophyllinae is an orchid subtribe in the tribe Diurideae.

== See also ==
- Taxonomy of the Orchidaceae
