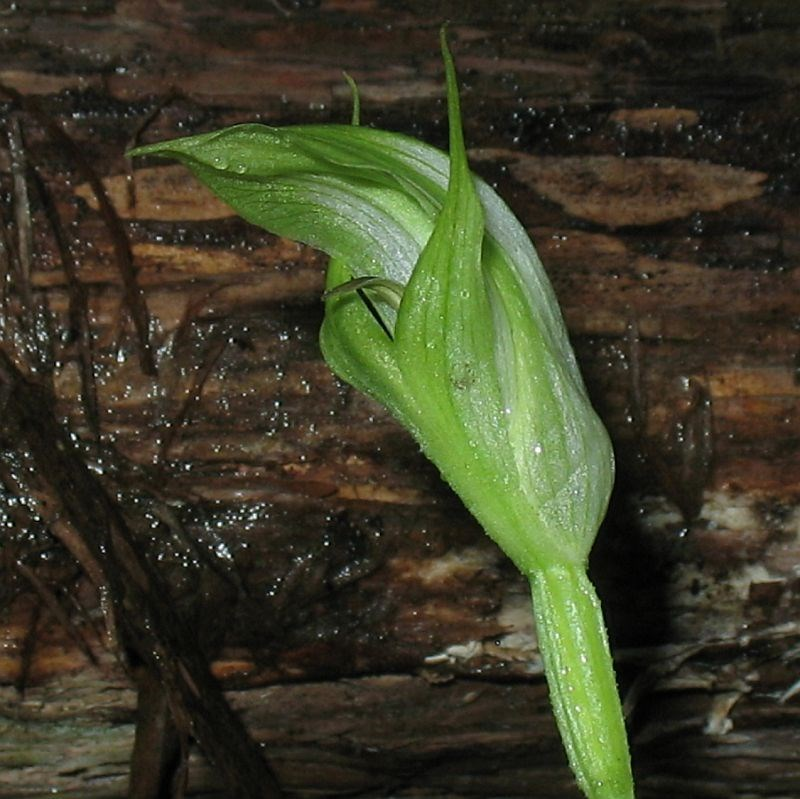
- Pterostylis aneba growing near Jindabyne

Scientific classification
- Kingdom: Plantae
- Clade: Tracheophytes
- Clade: Angiosperms
- Clade: Monocots
- Order: Asparagales
- Family: Orchidaceae
- Subfamily: Orchidoideae
- Tribe: Cranichideae
- Genus: Pterostylis
- Species: P. aneba

Binomial name
- Pterostylis aneba D.L.Jones

= Pterostylis aneba =

Species of orchid

Pterostylis aneba is a species of orchid endemic to south-eastern Australia. It is a recently described and poorly-known greenhood similar to Pterostylis alpina and P. monticola. It has a rosette of fleshy leaves at the base of the plant and a single green and white flower. It grows in alpine and sub-alpine habitats.

== Description ==
Pterostylis aneba is a terrestrial, perennial, deciduous, herb with an underground tuber and a rosette of three to five egg-shaped leaves surrounding the base of the flowering stem. Each leaf is 30–60 mm (1–2 in) long and 8–16 mm (0.3–0.6 in) wide. A single green and white flower about 30–40 mm (1–2 in) long is borne on a spike up to 200 mm (8 in) high. The dorsal sepal and petals are fused, forming a hood or "galea" over the column. The dorsal sepal is the same length as the petals and curves forward with a pointed tip. There is a gap between the galea and the lateral sepals. The lateral sepals are erect and have thread-like tips 15–20 mm long and a slightly bulging V-shaped sinus between them. The labellum is 15–18 mm (0.6–0.7 in) long, about 3 mm (0.1 in) wide, green or brown and curved and protrudes above the sinus. Flowering occurs from December to February.

== Taxonomy and naming ==
Pterostylis aneba was first formally described in 2006 by David Jones and the description was published in Australian Orchid Research from a specimen collected at Packers Swamp, west of Bemboka.

== Distribution and habitat ==
This greenhood grows in moist grassy areas in montane forest and near streams in southern New South Wales and north-eastern Victoria.
