= Pterostylis × aenigma =

Conservation status
- Endangered (EPBC Act)

Scientific classification
- Kingdom: Plantae
- Clade: Tracheophytes
- Clade: Angiosperms
- Clade: Monocots
- Order: Asparagales
- Family: Orchidaceae
- Subfamily: Orchidoideae
- Tribe: Cranichideae
- Genus: Pterostylis
- Species: P. × aenigma

Binomial name
- Pterostylis × aenigma D.L.Jones & M.A.Clem.

Species of orchid

Pterostylis × aenigma, commonly known as enigmatic greenhood, is a species of orchid endemic to Victoria in Australia. It has a rosette of leaves and a single green and white flower which leans forward and has a brownish point on the end. It is a rare orchid, occurring at only one site with fewer than 100 individual plants and is thought to be a natural hybrid between two species that grow nearby.

== Description ==
Pterostylis × aenigma has a rosette of between three and eight dark green, fleshy, flat leaves, each leaf 40–60 mm (1.6–2.4 in) long and 15–18 mm (0.6–0.7 in) wide. A single green and white flower is borne on a flowering spike 150–300 mm (6–10 in) high. The flowers are 40–45 mm (1.6–1.8 in) long, 14–18 mm (0.6–0.7 in) wide and lean forward or "nod". The dorsal sepal and petals are joined and curve forward forming a hood over the column. The dorsal sepal is longer than the petals and has a pointed tip. The tip of the hood is brownish. There is a notch in the sinus between the lateral sepals and a large gap between the lateral sepals and petals. The lateral sepals are olive brown and have thread-like tips 25–35 mm (0.98–1.4 in) long. The labellum protrudes through the sinus and is 18–21 mm (0.7–0.8 in) long, about 4 mm (0.2 in) wide, curved, dark brown and blunt. Flowering occurs between November and December.

== Taxonomy and naming ==
Pterostylis × aenigma was first described in 1993 by David Jones and Mark Clements from a specimen collected near Omeo. The description was published in Muelleria. The authors noted that this species is possibly a hybrid between Pterostylis cucullata and P. furcata (later corrected to P. falcata), both of which grow nearby. The specific epithet (aenigma) means "riddle" or "mystery", referring to the "puzzling origin and distribution of this species".

== Distribution and habitat ==
Pterostylis × aenigma grows in moist places near streams in open forest at an altitude of 950 m (3,000 ft) near Omeo.

== Conservation ==
About 50 plants of Pterostylis × aenigma were known in 2003 but only five were located in 2005. The population occurs in the Alpine National Park but is nevertheless threatened by grazing, weed invasion and site disturbance. The species is classified as "Endangered" by the Victorian Government and as "Endangered" (EN) under the Australian Government Environment Protection and Biodiversity Conservation Act 1999 (EPBC Act) and a recovery plan has been prepared.
