= Prasophyllum colemaniarum =

Lilac leek orchid

Conservation status
- Vulnerable (EPBC Act)

Scientific classification
- Kingdom: Plantae
- Clade: Tracheophytes
- Clade: Angiosperms
- Clade: Monocots
- Order: Asparagales
- Family: Orchidaceae
- Subfamily: Orchidoideae
- Tribe: Diurideae
- Genus: Prasophyllum
- Species: P. colemaniarum

Binomial name
- Prasophyllum colemaniarum R.S.Rogers

Synonyms
- Prasophyllum colemanae R.S.Rogers orth. var.; Prasophyllum colemaniae M.A.Clem. orth. var.

Species of orchid

Prasophyllum colemaniarum, commonly known as lilac leek orchid or Bayswater leek orchid, is a species of orchid endemic to Victoria. It has a single tubular leaf and between ten and forty greenish brown, lavender and pink flowers. It is only known from the eastern suburbs of Melbourne and is thought to be extinct.

== Description ==
Prasophyllum colemaniarum is a terrestrial, perennial, deciduous, herb with an underground tuber and a single tube-shaped leaf up to 200–300 mm (7.9–11.8 in) long and 4–6 mm (0.16–0.24 in) wide at the base. Between ten and forty greenish brown, lavender and pink flowers are arranged along a flowering spike 60–110 mm (2.4–4.3 in) long reaching to a height of 200–450 mm (7.9–17.7 in). As with others in the genus, the flowers are inverted so that the labellum is above the column rather than below it. The dorsal sepal is about 7 mm (0.28 in) long and 4 mm (0.16 in) wide, the lateral sepals 8 mm (0.31 in) long 2 mm (0.079 in) wide, free from each other and widely separated. The petals are about 7.5 mm (0.30 in) long and 1.8 mm (0.071 in) wide. The labellum is pink or white, 7–8 mm (0.28–0.31 in) long and about 4.5 mm (0.18 in) wide, the edges folded and crinkled with a pink or green callus ending near the bend in the labellum. Flowering occurs in November.

== Taxonomy and naming ==
Prasophyllum colemaniarum was first formally described in 1923 by Richard Sanders Rogers from a specimen collected at Bayswater in 1922, and the description was published in Transactions and proceedings of the Royal Society of South Australia. The specific epithet (colemaniarum) honours Edith Coleman who collected the type specimens, and her daughters.

== Distribution and habitat ==
This leek orchid grows among grass tussocks in open forest and was recorded from Heathmont and Bayswater in the eastern suburbs of Melbourne, but has not been seen since 1972 and is thought to be extinct.

== Conservation status ==
Prasophyllum colemaniarum (as Prasophyllum colemaniae) is listed as "vulnerable" under the Australian Government Environment Protection and Biodiversity Conservation Act 1999.
