= Pterostylis rogersii =

Curled-tongue shell orchid

Scientific classification
- Kingdom: Plantae
- Clade: Tracheophytes
- Clade: Angiosperms
- Clade: Monocots
- Order: Asparagales
- Family: Orchidaceae
- Subfamily: Orchidoideae
- Tribe: Cranichideae
- Genus: Pterostylis
- Species: P. rogersii

Binomial name
- Pterostylis rogersii E.Coleman

Synonyms
- Diplodium rogersii (E.Coleman) D.L.Jones & M.A.Clem.

Species of orchid

Pterostylis rogersii, commonly known as the curled-tongue shell orchid, is a species of orchid endemic to the south-west of Western Australia. As with similar orchids, the flowering plants differ from those which are not flowering. The non-flowering plants have a rosette of leaves but the flowering plants lack a rosette and have a single flower with leaves on the flowering spike. This greenhood usually has a white and reddish-brown striped flower with a long, curved labellum and is found along the south coast between Binningup and Esperance.

== Description ==
Pterostylis rogersii is a terrestrial, perennial, deciduous, herb with an underground tuber and when not flowering, a rosette of flat, bluish-green leaves, each leaf 5–15 mm (0.2–0.6 in) long and 4–12 mm (0.2–0.5 in) wide. Flowering plants usually have a single flower 25–35 mm (0.98–1.4 in) long and 9–12 mm (0.4–0.5 in) wide borne on a flowering stem 70–200 mm (3–8 in) high. There are also three to five stem leaves 20–70 mm (0.8–3 in) long and 2–8 mm (0.08–0.3 in) wide. The flowers are white with reddish-brown or less commonly green stripes. The dorsal sepal and petals are fused, forming a hood or "galea" over the column, the dorsal sepal curving forward with a sharp pointed tip. The lateral sepals are erect with a small gap between them and the galea and thread-like ends 20–25 mm (0.8–1 in) long. Between their bases there is a deep, V-shaped sinus. The labellum is 15–20 mm (0.6–0.8 in) long, 3–4 mm (0.1–0.2 in) wide, reddish-brown and curved or curled and protrudes above the sinus. Flowering occurs from June to August.

== Taxonomy and naming ==
Pterostylis rogersii was first formally described in 1930 by Edith Coleman and the description was published in The Victorian Naturalist from specimens collected between Bunbury and Collie. The specific epithet (rogersii) honours Richard Rogers "because the new species is abundant and beautiful".

== Distribution and habitat ==
The curled-tongue shell orchid is found in a narrow coastal strip between Binningup and Esperance in the Esperance Plains, Jarrah Forest, Swan Coastal Plain and Warren biogeographic regions.

== Conservation ==
Pterostylis rogersii is classified as "not threatened" by the Western Australian Government Department of Parks and Wildlife.
