= Pterostylis venosa =

Greenhood

Scientific classification
- Kingdom: Plantae
- Clade: Tracheophytes
- Clade: Angiosperms
- Clade: Monocots
- Order: Asparagales
- Family: Orchidaceae
- Subfamily: Orchidoideae
- Tribe: Cranichideae
- Genus: Pterostylis
- Species: P. venosa

Binomial name
- Pterostylis venosa Colenso

Synonyms
- Pterostylis trifolia Colenso; Pterostylis confertiflora Allan

Species of orchid

Pterostylis venosa, commonly known as a greenhood, is a species of orchid endemic to New Zealand and which usually grows in colonies. Both flowering and non-flowering plants have a rosette of erect to spreading leaves, and flowering plants have a single yellowish-green to dark green flower with white stripes. It is similar to P. humilis.

== Description ==
Pterostylis venosa is a terrestrial, perennial, deciduous, herb with an underground tuber and which usually grows in colonies of three or more plants. It has a loose rosette of between two and four erect to spreading leaves at the base and which in flowering plants are about the same height as the flowering stem. The leaves are a broad oval shape, 30–60 mm (1–2 in) long and 10–25 mm (0.4–1 in) wide. Flowering plants have a single yellowish-green to dark green flower with white stripes on a flowering stem 50–100 mm (2–4 in) tall. The dorsal sepal and petals are fused, forming a hood or "galea" over the column. The dorsal sepal is more or less erect near its base then curves forward to the horizontal, the petals about the same length as the dorsal sepal. There is a wide gap between the lateral sepals and the galea and the lateral sepals which are erect, spread slightly apart from each other and no higher than the galea. There is a broad V-shaped sinus between the lateral sepals. The labellum has a furry upper surface and is curved, protruding above the sinus. Flowering occurs between October and February.

== Taxonomy and naming ==
Pterostylis venosa was first formally described in 1895 by William Colenso from a specimen collected on the east side of the Ruahine Range. The description was published in Transactions and Proceedings of the New Zealand Institute. The specific epithet (venosa) is a Latin word meaning "veiny".

== Distribution and habitat ==
This greenhood mostly grows in montane ecosystems, usually in Nothofagus forest, often in deep leaf litter or moss beds. It is found on the North, South and Stewart Islands.
