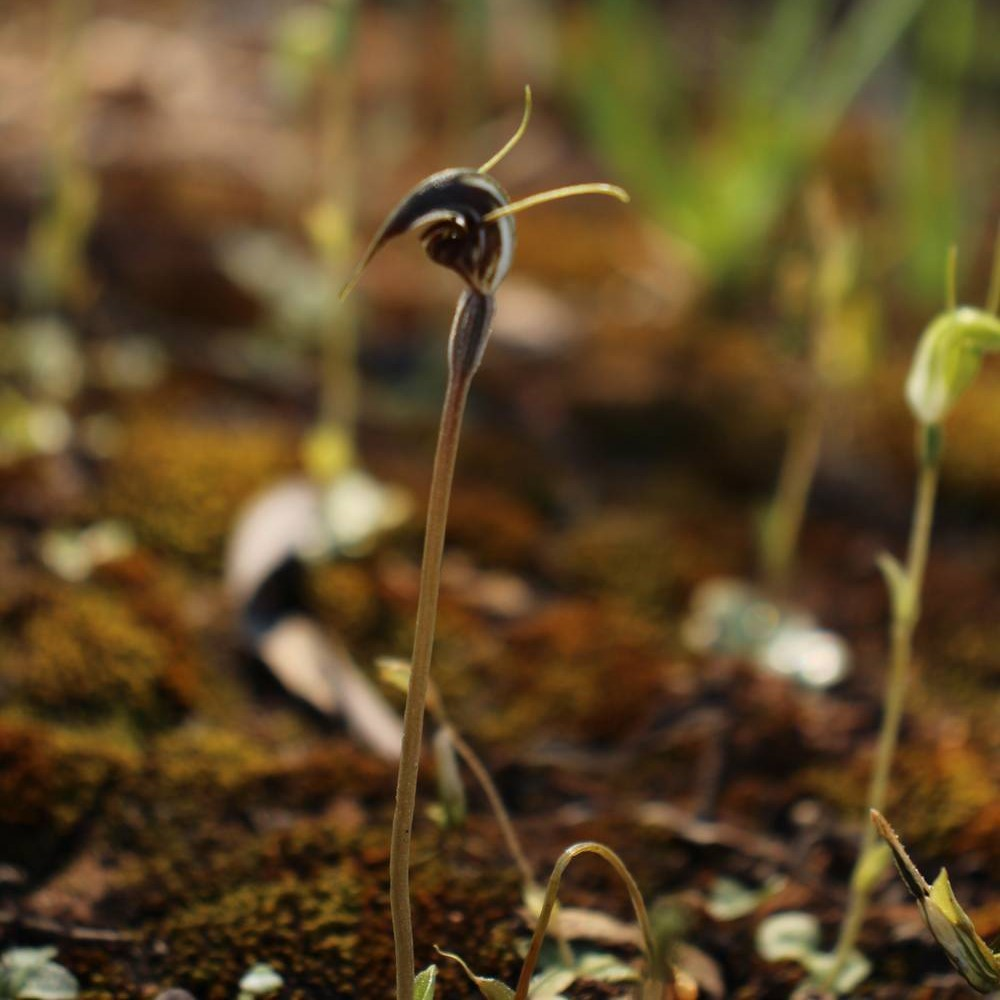

Scientific classification
- Kingdom: Plantae
- Clade: Tracheophytes
- Clade: Angiosperms
- Clade: Monocots
- Order: Asparagales
- Family: Orchidaceae
- Subfamily: Orchidoideae
- Tribe: Cranichideae
- Genus: Pterostylis
- Species: P. allantoidea

Binomial name
- Pterostylis allantoidea R.S.Rogers

Synonyms
- Diplodium allantoideum (R.S.Rogers) D.L.Jones & M.A.Clem.; Eremorchis allantoidea (R.S.Rogers) D.L.Jones & M.A.Clem.

= Pterostylis allantoidea =

Shy greenhood

Species of orchid

Pterostylis allantoidea, commonly known as shy greenhood, is a species of orchid which is endemic to the south-west of Western Australia. It has a large rosette of leaves at the base of a flowering spike and a single white flower with green or reddish-brown stripes.

== Description ==
Pterostylis allantoidea, is a terrestrial, perennial, deciduous, herb with an underground tuber and which usually grows in colonies. It has a rosette of large, dark green leaves with wrinkled edges, each leaf 5–15 mm (0.2–0.6 in) long and 1–10 mm (0.04–0.4 in) wide. When flowering, there is usually only a single, white flower with green or reddish-brown stripes. The flowers lean forwards and are 12–15 mm (0.5–0.6 in) long, 6–8 mm (0.2–0.3 in) wide and borne on a flowering spike 80–100 mm (3–4 in) tall. The dorsal sepal and petals form a hood over the column. The dorsal sepal is longer than the petals and has a thread-like tip 6–8 mm (0.2–0.3 in) long. The lateral sepals are erect with thread-like tips 10–14 mm (0.4–0.6 in) long with a bulging sinus between them. The labellum is egg-shaped, 4–5 mm (0.16–0.20 in) long, about 1 mm (0.04 in) wide, thick, fleshy, dark brown and curved and protrudes above the sinus. Flowering occurs from August to September.

== Taxonomy and naming ==
Pterostylis allantoidea was first formally described in 1940 by Richard Sanders Rogers in Transactions of the Royal Society of South Australia. The specific epithet (allantoidea) is from the Latin allantoideus, 'sausage-shaped', referring to the shape of the labellum.

== Distribution and habitat ==
The shy greenhood grows on and near granite outcrops under shrubs between Coolgardie, Ravensthorpe and Israelite Bay in the Coolgardie and Esperance Plains biogeographic regions of Western Australia.

== Conservation status ==
Pterostylis allantoidea is classified as "not threatened" by the Government of Western Australia Department of Parks and Wildlife.
