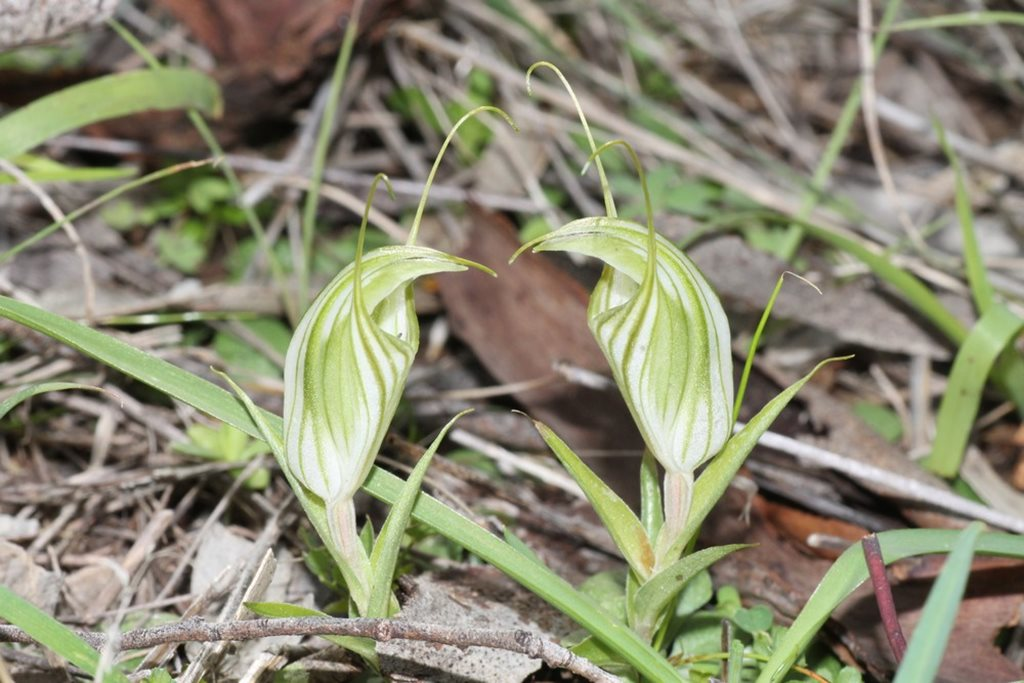
- Near Charlton

Scientific classification
- Kingdom: Plantae
- Clade: Tracheophytes
- Clade: Angiosperms
- Clade: Monocots
- Order: Asparagales
- Family: Orchidaceae
- Subfamily: Orchidoideae
- Tribe: Cranichideae
- Genus: Pterostylis
- Species: P. robusta

Binomial name
- Pterostylis robusta R.S.Rogers

Synonyms
- Diplodium robustum (R.S.Rogers) D.L.Jones & M.A.Clem.; Pterostylis alata var. robusta (Ewart) Tovey & P.Morris; Pterostylis alata var. robusta (R.S.Rogers) J.Z.Weber & R.J.Bates nom. illeg.; Pterostylis praecox var. robusta Ewart; Pterostylis scabra var. robusta (R.S.Rogers) A.S.George; Pterostylis reflexa auct. non R.Br.: Rogers, R.S. in Black, J.M. (1922)

= Pterostylis robusta =

Sharp-leaf greenhood

Species of orchid

Pterostylis robusta, commonly known as sharp-leaf greenhood, is a species of orchid endemic to south-eastern Australia. As with similar orchids, the flowering plants differ from those which are not flowering. The non-flowering plants have a rosette of leaves but the flowering plants have a single flower with leaves on the flowering spike. This greenhood has a relatively large green, white and reddish-brown flower with reddish-brown stripes with the labellum just visible inside the flower.

== Description ==
Pterostylis robusta is a terrestrial, perennial, deciduous, herb with an underground tuber and when not flowering, a rosette of four to ten, dark green, egg-shaped leaves. Each leaf is 10–25 mm long and 10–16 mm wide. Flowering plants have a single flower 27–35 mm long and 10–12 mm wide borne on a spike 50–200 mm high with three to seven spreading stem leaves. The flowers are green, white and brownish with a reddish-brown tinge or stripes. The dorsal sepal and petals are fused, forming a hood or "galea" over the column. The dorsal sepal curves forward with a sharp point 2–4 mm long. The lateral sepals are erect, held closely against the galea, have an erect, thread-like tip 20–30 mm long and a flat sinus with a small notch between their bases. The labellum is 12–15 mm long, 3–4 mm wide, dark brown or green and just visible inside the flower. Flowering occurs from April to August.

== Taxonomy and naming ==
Pterostylis robusta was first formally described in 1927 by Richard Sanders Rogers and the description was published Transactions and Proceedings of the Royal Society of South Australia. The specific epithet (robusta) is a Latin word meaning "strong like oak" or "robust".

== Distribution and habitat ==
Sharp-leaf greenhood is most common in the higher rainfall areas of South Australia where it sometimes forms extensive colonies. In Victoria it grows in open forest in the north-west of the state but it is rare in New South Wales where it grows on sheltered ridges south from Wagga Wagga.
