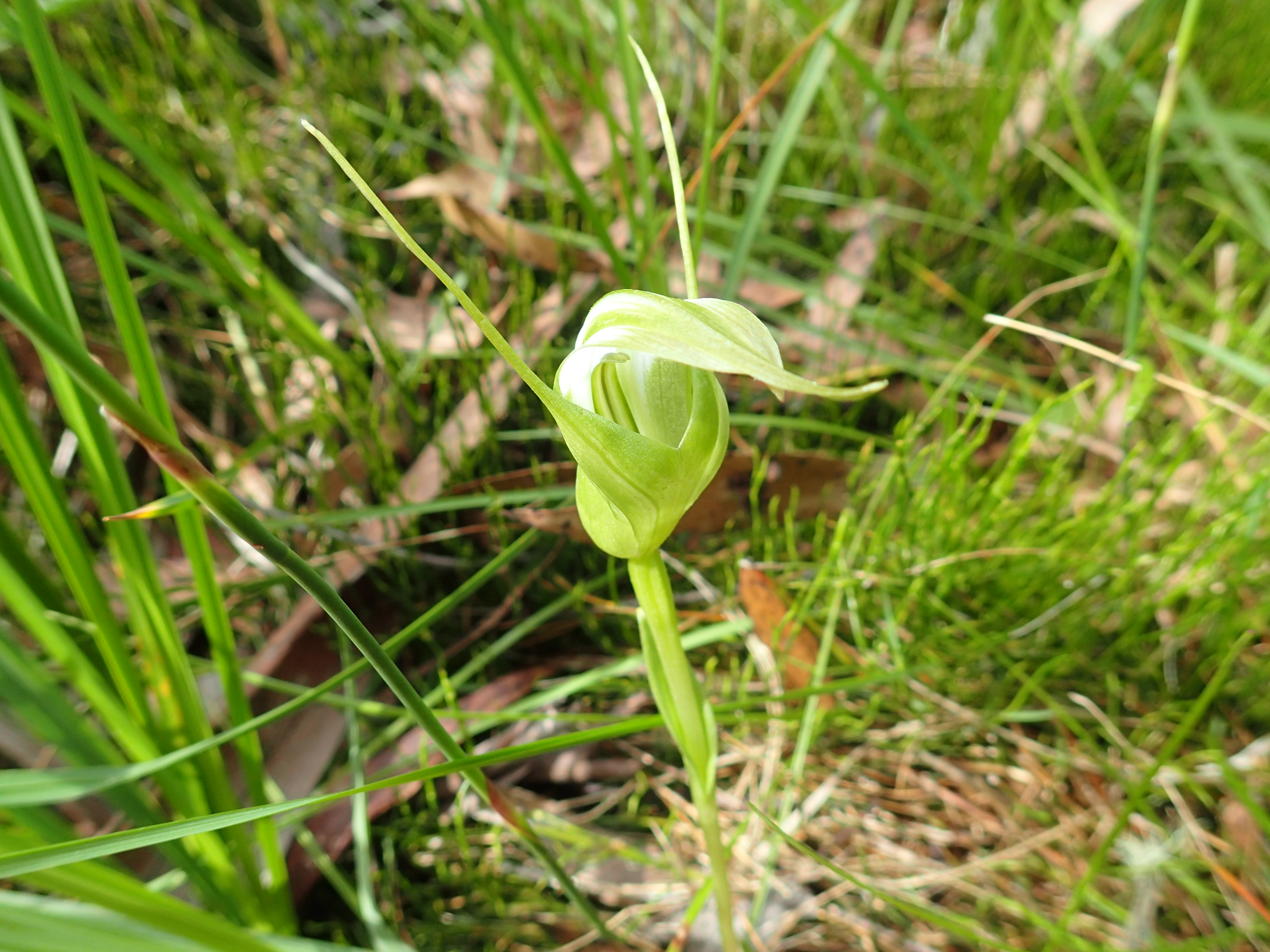
- Pterostylis falcata growing in swamp, Barrington Tops National Park

Scientific classification
- Kingdom: Plantae
- Clade: Tracheophytes
- Clade: Angiosperms
- Clade: Monocots
- Order: Asparagales
- Family: Orchidaceae
- Subfamily: Orchidoideae
- Tribe: Cranichideae
- Genus: Pterostylis
- Species: P. falcata

Binomial name
- Pterostylis falcata R.S.Rogers

= Pterostylis falcata =

Sickle greenhood

Species of orchid

Pterostylis falcata, commonly known as the sickle greenhood, is a species of orchid endemic to south-eastern Australia. It has a rosette of bright green leaves at the base of the plant and a single green and white, sickle-shaped flower. It is widespread and often common in Victoria but also occurs further north and west, and in Tasmania

== Description ==
Pterostylis falcata is a terrestrial, perennial, deciduous, herb with an underground tuber and a rosette of three to six bright green leaves surrounding the base of the flowering stem. Each leaf is lance-shaped to egg-shaped, 30–80 mm (1–3 in) long and 14–25 mm (0.6–1 in) wide. A single dark green and white flower 60–80 mm (2–3 in) long and 20–24 mm (0.8–0.9 in) wide is borne on a spike 150–300 mm (6–10 in) high. The dorsal sepal and petals are fused, forming a hood or "galea" over the column. The dorsal sepal is much longer than the petals and gradually tapers to a point. There is a wide gap between the galea and the lateral sepals. The lateral sepals are erect and have narrow tips 30–40 mm (1–2 in) long and a deep V-shaped sinus between them. The labellum is 25–34 mm (0.98–1.3 in) long, 3–4 mm (0.1–0.2 in) wide, brown, and curved and half of it protrudes through the sinus. Flowering occurs from September to February.

== Taxonomy and naming ==
Pterostylis falcata was first formally described in 1915 by Richard Sanders Rogers and the description was published in Proceedings of the Royal Society of Victoria. The specific epithet (falcata) is a Latin word meaning "curved like a sickle".

== Distribution and habitat ==
The sickle greenhood occurs in the south-eastern states of Australia where it grows in wet places such as near creeks, and the rosette is sometimes covered by flowing water. It is most common and widespread in Victoria but is also found in eastern New South Wales, the Australian Capital Territory, Queensland, South Australia and Tasmania but is classed as "endangered" in the last two of these states.
