= Pterostylis crassichila =

Plump northern greenhood

Scientific classification
- Kingdom: Plantae
- Clade: Tracheophytes
- Clade: Angiosperms
- Clade: Monocots
- Order: Asparagales
- Family: Orchidaceae
- Subfamily: Orchidoideae
- Tribe: Cranichideae
- Genus: Pterostylis
- Species: P. crassichila

Binomial name
- Pterostylis crassichila D.L.Jones

Species of orchid

Pterostylis crassichila, commonly known as the plump northern greenhood, is a species of orchid endemic to Queensland. It has a rosette of leaves at the base of the plant and a single white flower with green lines, reddish towards its tip. It grows in higher areas of north Queensland.

== Description ==
Pterostylis crassichila is a terrestrial, perennial, deciduous, herb with an underground tuber and a rosette of leaves which are 20–60 mm (0.8–2 in) long and 15–23 mm (0.6–0.9 in) wide. A single white flower with green lines and 25–32 mm (0.98–1.3 in) long, 20–25 mm (0.8–1 in) wide with a reddish-brown tip, is borne on a spike 150–300 mm (6–10 in) high. The dorsal sepal and petals are fused, forming a hood or "galea" over the column. The dorsal sepal is about the same length as the petals. There is a wide gap between the galea and the lateral sepals. The lateral sepals are erect or turned backwards, have narrow tips 20–25 mm (0.8–1 in) long and a bulging sinus between them. The labellum is 20–23 mm (0.8–0.9 in) long, 4–5 mm (0.16–0.20 in) wide, dark brown, curved and protrudes above the sinus. Flowering occurs from April to July.

== Taxonomy and naming ==
Pterostylis crassichila was first formally described in 2006 by David Jones and the description was published in Australian Orchid Research from a specimen collected near Herberton. The specific epithet (crassichila) is derived from the Latin word crassus meaning "thick" and the Ancient Greek word cheilos meaning "lip".

== Distribution and habitat ==
The plump northern greenhood grows in the Tablelands Region of north Queensland among grasses and small shrubs in moist, sheltered places in open forest above 800 m (3,000 ft).
