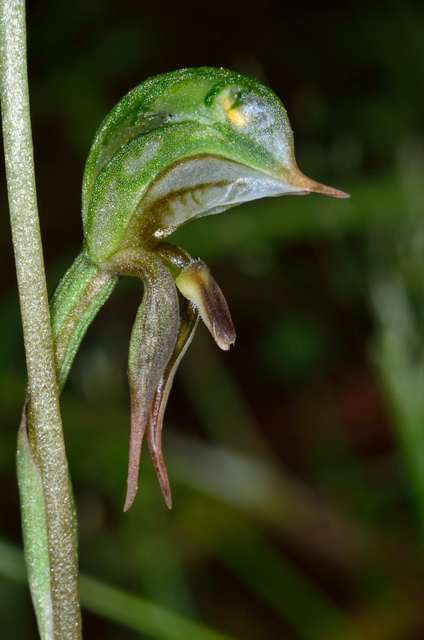
- Pterostylis pusilla in the Mount Remarkable National Park

Scientific classification
- Kingdom: Plantae
- Clade: Tracheophytes
- Clade: Angiosperms
- Clade: Monocots
- Order: Asparagales
- Family: Orchidaceae
- Subfamily: Orchidoideae
- Tribe: Cranichideae
- Genus: Pterostylis
- Species: P. pusilla

Binomial name
- Pterostylis pusilla R.S.Rogers

Synonyms
- Oligochaetochilus pusilla Szlach. orth. var.; Oligochaetochilus pusillus (R.S.Rogers) Szlach.; Pterostylis pusilla R.S.Rogers var. pusilla

= Pterostylis pusilla =

Tiny rustyhood

Species of orchid

Pterostylis pusilla, commonly known as the tiny rustyhood is a plant in the orchid family Orchidaceae and is endemic to southern Australia. It has a rosette of leaves and up to nine relatively small green and reddish-brown flowers with translucent white "windows" and a dark brown, insect-like labellum.

== Description ==
Pterostylis pusilla is a terrestrial, perennial, deciduous, herb with an underground tuber. It has a rosette of between three and eight leaves, each leaf 10–30 mm (0.4–1 in) long and 5–12 mm (0.2–0.5 in) wide. Flowering plants have a rosette at the base of the flowering stem and up to nine green and reddish-brown flowers with translucent white panels and which are 13–16 mm (0.5–0.6 in) long and about 5 mm (0.20 in) wide on a flowering stem 80–250 mm (3–10 in) tall. There are between two and four stem leaves with their bases wrapped around the flowering stem. The dorsal sepal and petals are fused to form a hood called the "galea" over the column, with the dorsal sepal having a narrow, upturned point 2–3 mm (0.08–0.1 in) long. The lateral sepals turn downwards, much narrower than the galea and have thread-like tips 3–5 mm (0.1–0.2 in) long. The labellum is relatively thick, reddish-brown and insect-like, about 4 mm (0.2 in) long and 2 mm (0.08 in) wide. The "head" end has many short hairs and there are between two and four longer hairs on each side of the body. Flowering occurs from September to October.

== Taxonomy and naming ==
Pterostylis pusilla was first formally described in 1918 by Richard Rogers from specimens sent to him from South Australia and Victoria. The description was published in Transactions and Proceedings of the Royal Society of South Australia. The specific epithet (pusilla) is a Latin word meaning "very little", "small", "petty", "puny" or "insignificant".

== Distribution and habitat ==
The tiny rustyhood usually grows in leaf litter in open forest or mallee scrub in stony soil. It is found in New South Wales south from Temora, across Victoria and in the south of South Australia in areas with an average annual rainfall of 250–600 mm (10–20 in).
