= Pterostylis aquilonia =

Northern cobra greenhood

Scientific classification
- Kingdom: Plantae
- Clade: Tracheophytes
- Clade: Angiosperms
- Clade: Monocots
- Order: Asparagales
- Family: Orchidaceae
- Subfamily: Orchidoideae
- Tribe: Cranichideae
- Genus: Pterostylis
- Species: P. aquilonia

Binomial name
- Pterostylis aquilonia D.L.Jones & B.Gray

Synonyms
- Diplodium aquilonium (D.L.Jones & B.Gray) D.L.Jones & M.A.Clem.

Species of orchid

Pterostylis aquilonia, commonly known as northern cobra greenhood, is a species of orchid endemic to Queensland. As with similar orchids, the flowering plants differ from those which are not flowering. The non-flowering plants have a rosette of leaves, but the flowering plants lack a rosette and have a single flower with leaves on the flowering spike. This greenhood has a relatively large green, white and reddish-brown self-pollinating flower.

== Description ==
Pterostylis aquilonia is a terrestrial, perennial, deciduous, herb with an underground tuber and when not flowering, a rosette of light green leaves 5–15 mm (0.2–0.6 in) long and 5–12 mm (0.2–0.5 in) wide. Flowering plants have a single flower 20–25 mm (0.8–1 in) long and 10–12 mm (0.4–0.5 in) wide borne on a spike 150–200 mm (6–8 in) high. The flowers are white, green, and reddish-brown. The dorsal sepal and petals are fused, forming a hood or "galea" over the column. The dorsal sepal curves forward and ends with a short point. The lateral sepals are erect with thread-like ends 22–25 mm (0.9–1 in) long with their tips bent forwards. The lateral sepals are held closely against the galea, and there is a broad, flat, platform-like sinus between their bases. The labellum is 11–13 mm (0.4–0.5 in) long, about 2 mm (0.08 in) wide and brown while slightly protruding above the sinus. Flowering occurs from May to June.

== Taxonomy and naming ==
Pterostylis aquilonia was first formally described in 1997 by David Jones and Bruce Gray. The description was published in The Orchadian from a specimen collected near Herberton. The specific epithet (aquilonia) is a Latin word meaning "north" or "northern".

== Distribution and habitat ==
Northern cobra greenhood grows in forest on the higher parts of the Atherton Tableland.
