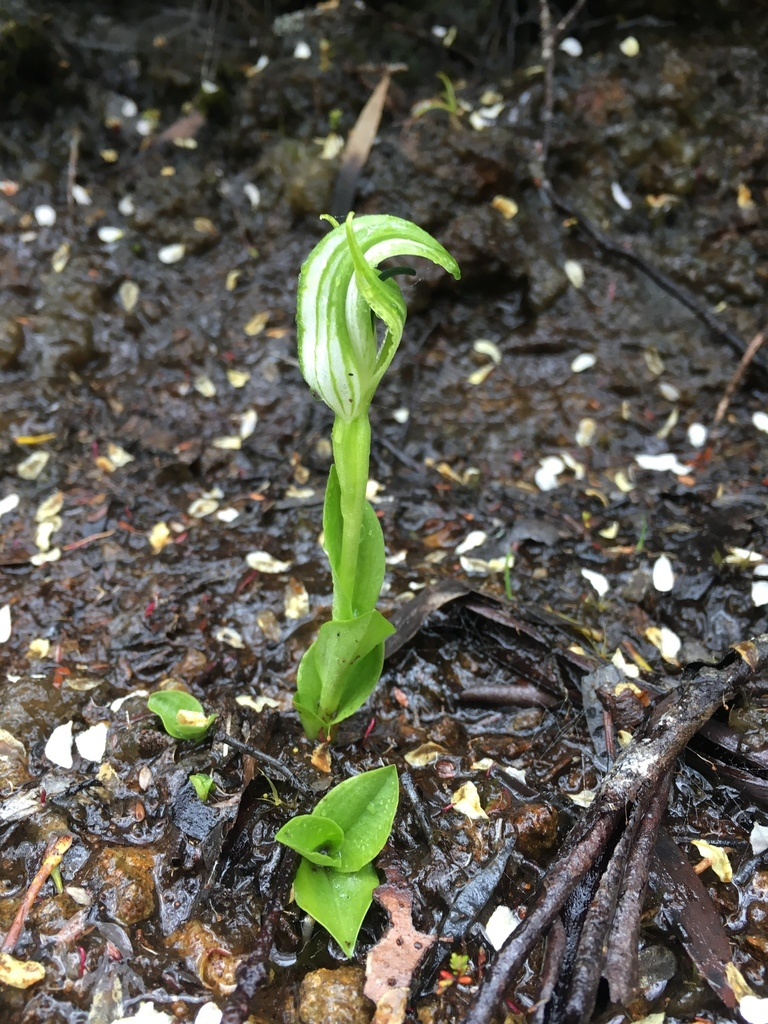
- Near Mount Wellington

Scientific classification
- Kingdom: Plantae
- Clade: Tracheophytes
- Clade: Angiosperms
- Clade: Monocots
- Order: Asparagales
- Family: Orchidaceae
- Subfamily: Orchidoideae
- Tribe: Cranichideae
- Genus: Pterostylis
- Species: P. dubia

Binomial name
- Pterostylis dubia R.Br.

= Pterostylis dubia =

Blue-tongued greenhood

Species of orchid

Pterostylis dubia, commonly known as the blue-tongued greenhood, is a plant in the orchid family Orchidaceae and is endemic to Tasmania. It has a rosette of fleshy leaves at its base and a dark green and white flower with narrow petals and a dark blue-green labellum.

== Description ==
Pterostylis dubia, is a terrestrial, perennial, deciduous, herb with an underground tuber. It has a rosette of leaves which are 15–60 mm (0.6–2 in) long, 8–20 mm (0.3–0.8 in) wide and have a stalk. Flowering plant have a single dark green and white flower 20–26 mm (0.8–1 in) long and 9–12 mm (0.4–0.5 in) wide is borne on a flowering stem 80–200 mm (3–8 in) tall with stalkless stem leaves. The dorsal sepal and petals are joined, forming a hood called the "galea" over the column. The petals are not flared and are similar in length to the dorsal sepal which ends in a point. There is a wide gap at each side of the flower between the galea and the lateral sepals. The lateral sepals are erect and have a tapering tip, 14–22 mm (0.6–0.9 in) long, only slightly taller than the galea and there is a notch in the bulging sinus between them. The labellum is 13–17 mm (0.5–0.7 in) long, about 3 mm (0.1 in) wide, dark bluish-green, curved and protrudes prominently above the sinus. Flowering occurs from November to January.

== Taxonomy and naming ==
Pterostylis dubia was first formally described in 1810 by Robert Brown and the description was published in Prodromus Florae Novae Hollandiae et Insulae Van Diemen. The specific epithet (dubia) is a Latin word meaning "wavering", "uncertain" or "doubtful".

== Distribution and habitat ==
The blue-tongued greenhood grows in wet forest at altitudes above 500 m (1,600 ft) in central and southern Tasmania.
