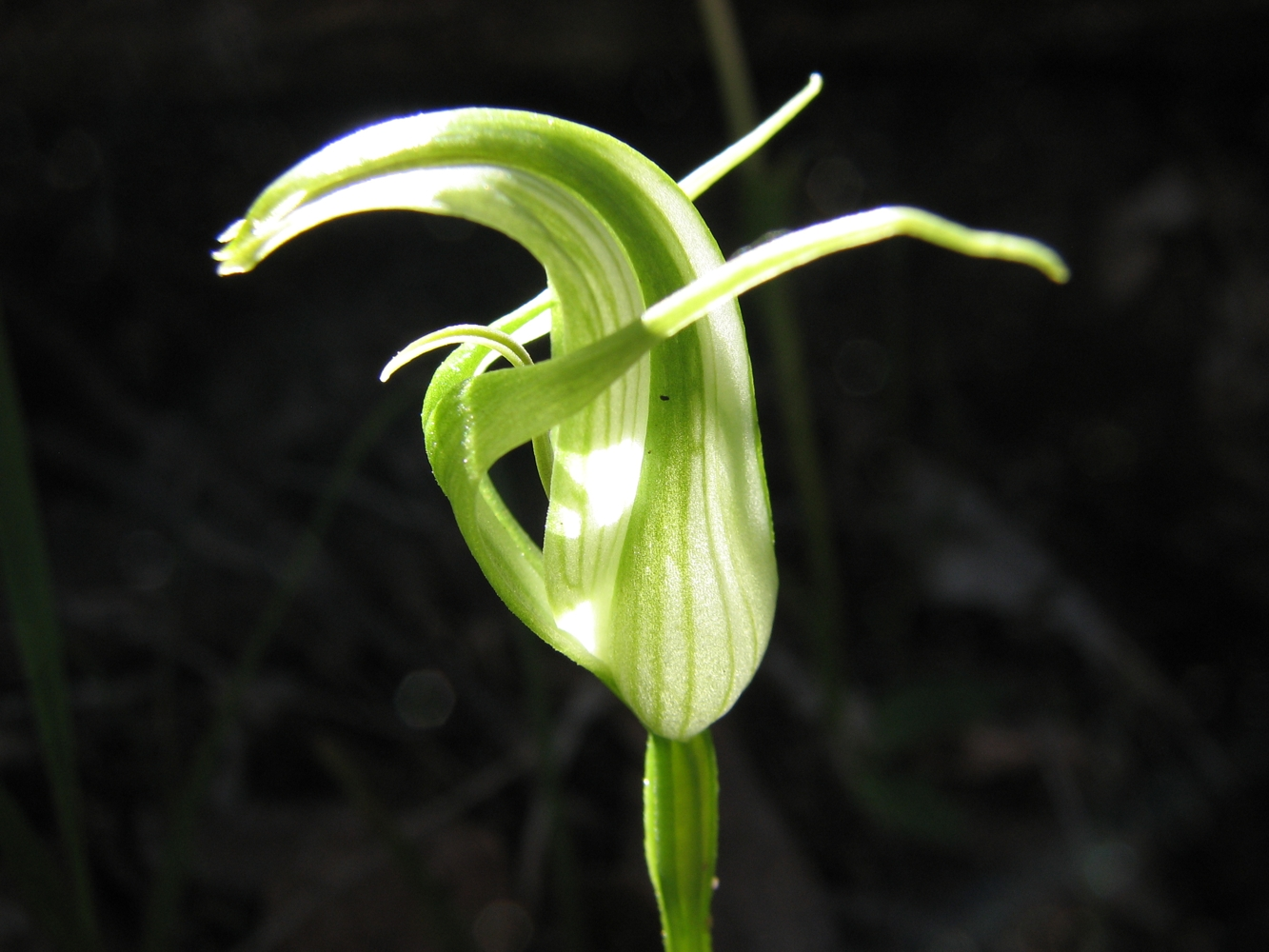
- Pterostylis alpina growing near Riddells Creek

Scientific classification
- Kingdom: Plantae
- Clade: Tracheophytes
- Clade: Angiosperms
- Clade: Monocots
- Order: Asparagales
- Family: Orchidaceae
- Subfamily: Orchidoideae
- Tribe: Cranichideae
- Genus: Pterostylis
- Species: P. alpina

Binomial name
- Pterostylis alpina R.S.Rogers

= Pterostylis alpina =

Mountain greenhood

Species of orchid

Pterostylis alpina, commonly known as the mountain greenhood, is a species of orchid endemic to south-eastern Australia. It has a rosette of fleshy leaves at the base and usually only one white flower with green markings and back-swept lateral sepals.

== Description ==
Pterostylis alpina is a terrestrial, perennial, deciduous, herb with an underground tuber and a rosette of three to five leaves surrounding the base of the flowering stem. Each leaf is egg-shaped to elliptic, 30–60 mm long and 15–30 mm wide. A single white flower with dark green marks and 25–30 mm long and 9–12 mm wide is borne on a spike 120–300 mm high. The dorsal sepal and petals are fused, forming a hood or "galea" over the column. The dorsal sepal curves forward with a pointed tip. There is a wide gap between the galea and the lateral sepals. The lateral sepals are swept back, have thread-like tips 13–18 mm long and a bulging sinus between them. The labellum is 12–14 mm long, about 3 mm wide, dark green to brown, blunt, and curved and protrudes above the sinus. Flowering occurs from August to October.

== Taxonomy and naming ==
Pterostylis alpina was first formally described in 1915 by Richard Rogers and the description was published in Proceedings of the Royal Society of Victoria. The specific epithet (alpina) is a Latin word meaning "of high mountains".

== Distribution and habitat ==
The mountain greenhood is widespread in northern and eastern Victoria but is restricted to the Batlow region in New South Wales. It grows in high rainfall forests on the ranges, often on south-facing slopes.

== Conservation ==
Pterostylis alpina is classed as "vulnerable" in New South Wales under the Threatened Species Conservation Act 1995.
