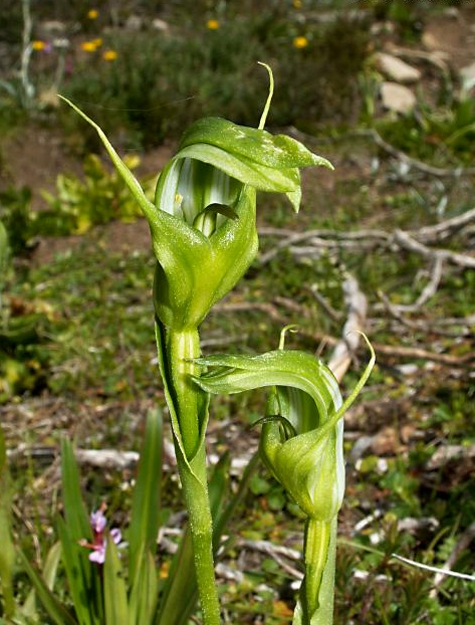
- Pterostylis monticola growing near Mount St Gwinear

Scientific classification
- Kingdom: Plantae
- Clade: Tracheophytes
- Clade: Angiosperms
- Clade: Monocots
- Order: Asparagales
- Family: Orchidaceae
- Subfamily: Orchidoideae
- Tribe: Cranichideae
- Genus: Pterostylis
- Species: P. monticola

Binomial name
- Pterostylis monticola D.L.Jones

= Pterostylis monticola =

Large mountain greenhood

Species of orchid

Pterostylis monticola, commonly known as the large mountain greenhood, is a species of orchid endemic to south-eastern Australia. It has a rosette of fleshy leaves at the base of the plant and a single dark green and white flower. It grows in alpine and sub-alpine colonies.

== Description ==
Pterostylis monticola is a terrestrial, perennial, deciduous, herb with an underground tuber and a rosette of three to seven dark green, fleshy leaves surrounding the base of the flowering stem. Each leaf is egg-shaped to elliptic, 40–90 mm long and 15–25 mm wide. A single dark green and white flower 40–50 mm long and 17–22 mm wide is borne on a spike 200–400 mm high. The dorsal sepal and petals are fused, forming a hood or "galea" over the column. The dorsal sepal is the same length as the petals and curves forward with a pointed tip. There is a wide gap between the galea and the lateral sepals. The lateral sepals are erect and have thread-like tips 15–20 mm long and a bulging V-shaped sinus between them. The labellum is 16–20 mm long, about 4 mm wide, brown and curved and protrudes above the sinus. Flowering occurs from November to March.

== Taxonomy and naming ==
Pterostylis monticola was first formally described in 1994 by David Jones and the description was published in Muelleria from a specimen collected in the Brindabella Range. The specific epithet (monticola) is said to derived from the Latin mons, meaning "mountain" and cola, meaning "dweller", referring to the montane habitat of this orchid. Cola can not be found in classical Latin as a single word, but is seen as part of compounds, such as Apenninicola, "a dweller among the Apennines" and terricola, "a dweller upon earth".

== Distribution and habitat ==
The large mountain greenhood is common in moist grassy areas in montane forest and shrubland in New South Wales and Victoria.
