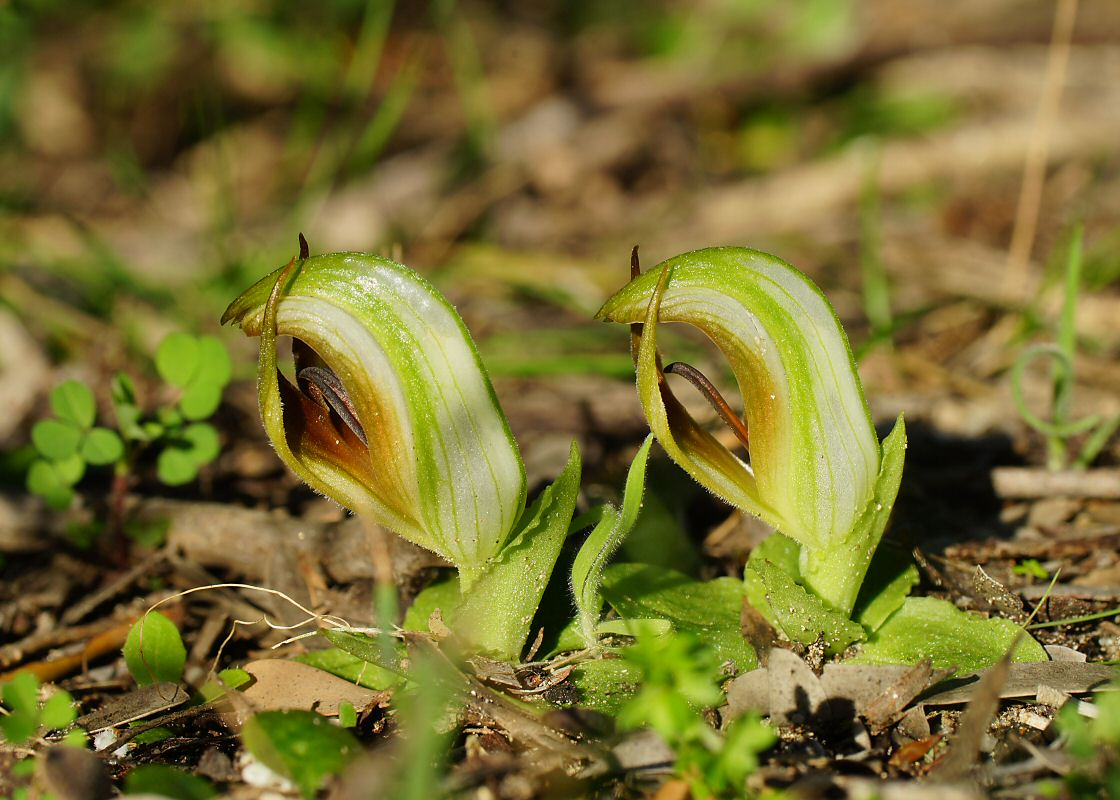
- Pterostylis cucullata subsp. cucullata growing on Wilsons Promontory

Conservation status
- Vulnerable (EPBC Act)

Scientific classification
- Kingdom: Plantae
- Clade: Tracheophytes
- Clade: Angiosperms
- Clade: Monocots
- Order: Asparagales
- Family: Orchidaceae
- Subfamily: Orchidoideae
- Tribe: Cranichideae
- Genus: Pterostylis
- Species: P. cucullata

Binomial name
- Pterostylis cucullata R.Br.

= Pterostylis cucullata =

Leafy greenhood

Species of orchid

Pterostylis cucullata, commonly known as the leafy greenhood, is a plant in the orchid family Orchidaceae and is endemic to south-eastern Australia. It has a rosette of fleshy leaves at its base and a single white, green and reddish-brown flower.

== Description ==
Pterostylis cucullata, is a terrestrial, perennial, deciduous, herb with an underground tuber. It has between four and seven egg-shaped to oblong leaves, some of which form a rosette at the base and some partly wrap around the flowering stem. The leaves are 40–100 mm (2–4 in) long and 15–30 mm (0.6–1 in) wide, dark green, fleshy and flat. A single white, green and reddish-brown flower is borne on a flowering stem 50–250 mm (2–10 in) high. The flowers are 35–40 mm (1–2 in) long, 20–25 mm (0.8–1 in) wide. The dorsal sepal and petals are joined and curve forward in a semi-circle, forming a hood called the "galea" over the column. There is a wide gap at each side of the flower between the petals and the lateral sepals. The lateral sepals have a tapering tip, 20–25 mm (0.8–1 in) long, only slightly longer than the galea and there is a narrow but deep notch in the sinus between them. The labellum is 14–17 mm (0.6–0.7 in) long, about 4 mm (0.2 in) wide, slightly curved, dark brown and blunt and only protrudes slightly above the sinus. Flowering occurs from August to October.

== Taxonomy and naming ==
Pterostylis cucullata was first formally described in 1810 by Robert Brown and the description was published in Prodromus Florae Novae Hollandiae et Insulae Van Diemen. The specific epithet (cucullata) is derived from the Latin word cucullus meaning "cap", or "hood".

There are two subspecies, differing mainly in the height of the flowering stem:

- Pterostylis cucullata subsp. cucullata grows to a height of 50–120 mm (2–5 in);
- Pterostylis cucullata subsp. sylvicola grows to a height of up to 250 mm (10 in).

== Distribution and habitat ==
The leafy greenhood is widely distributed in Victoria, South Australia and Tasmania but only in small, isolated populations. Both subspecies are present in Victoria as small groups in coastal areas and inland watercourses. It grows in shady forest slopes in South Australia but is very rare there. It is extinct on the main island of Tasmania and King Island, presently found only on Hunter Island and Three Hummock Island in Bass Strait.

== Conservation ==
Pterostylis cucullata is listed as "vulnerable" under the Australian Government Environment Protection and Biodiversity Conservation Act 1999. The main threats to the species are habitat loss and disturbance, weed invasion and grazing by rabbits, hares and snails.
