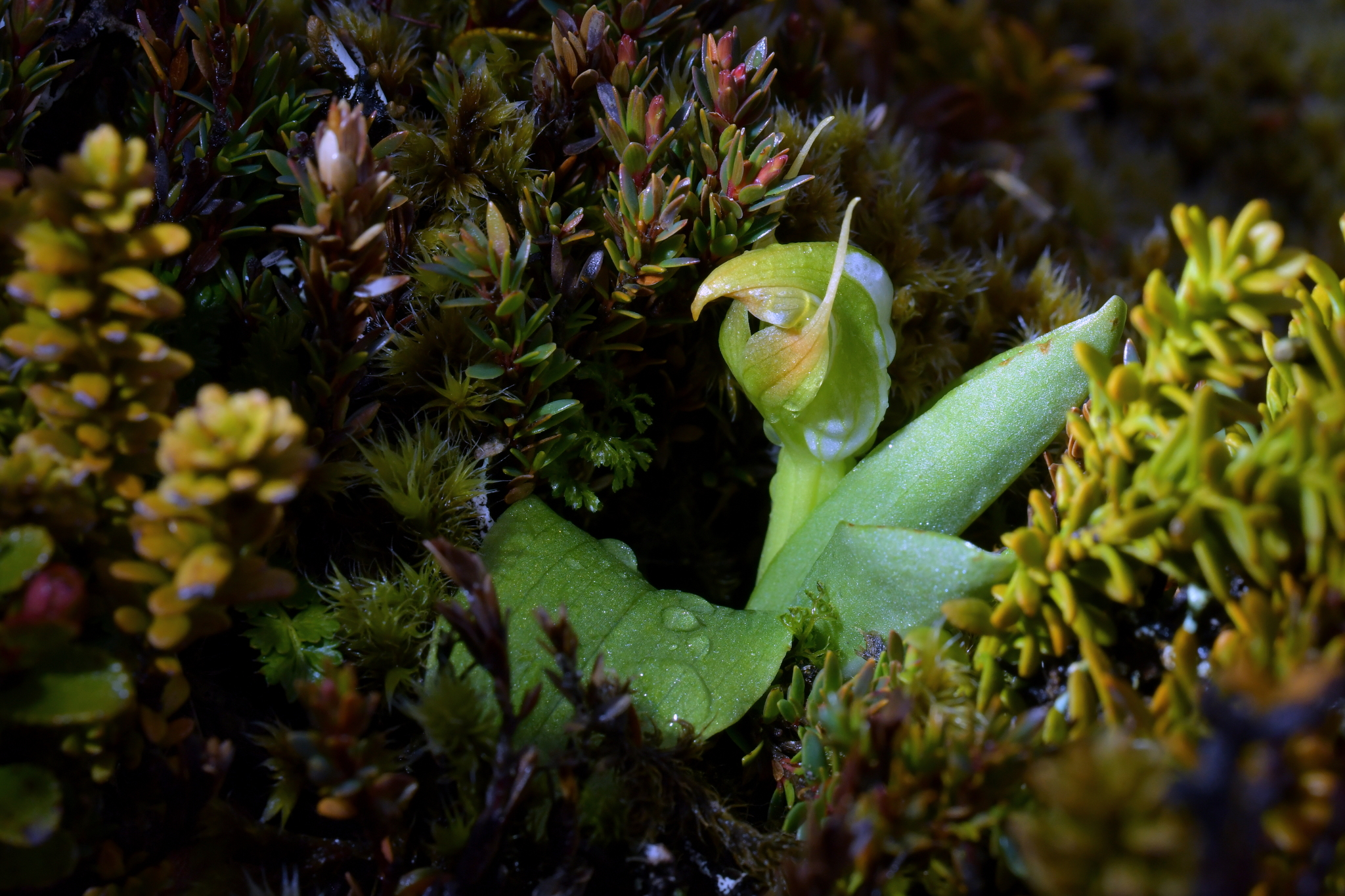
- In Tongariro National Park

Conservation status
- Least Concern (IUCN 3.1)

Scientific classification
- Kingdom: Plantae
- Clade: Tracheophytes
- Clade: Angiosperms
- Clade: Monocots
- Order: Asparagales
- Family: Orchidaceae
- Subfamily: Orchidoideae
- Tribe: Cranichideae
- Genus: Pterostylis
- Species: P. humilis

Binomial name
- Pterostylis humilis R.S.Rogers

= Pterostylis humilis =

Species of orchid

Pterostylis humilis is a species of orchid endemic to New Zealand. It has a rosette of leaves at the base of the plant and when flowering stem, leaves which usually obscure the dark green and white flower.

== Description ==
Pterostylis humilis is a terrestrial, perennial, deciduous, herb with an underground tuber and which often forms colonies. It has a loose rosette of leaves at the base and when flowering, between three and four more or less erect stem leaves, 40–90 mm (2–4 in) long and 15–25 mm (0.6–1 in) wide. The top-most leaves are higher than, and usually obscure the flowers. There is a single dark green flower with translucent white stripes and a reddish-brown tinge borne on a flowering stem 45–55 mm (1.8–2.2 in) tall or higher. The dorsal sepal and petals are fused, forming a hood or "galea" over the column. The dorsal sepal is more or less erect near its base then curves forward to the horizontal. The petals are slightly flared and slightly shorter than the dorsal sepal which has a short tip. There is a wide gap between the lateral sepals and the galea and the lateral sepals have thread-like tips which are erect, spread slightly apart from each other and are higher than the galea. The labellum is dark reddish-brown, curved and protrudes slightly above the sinus. Flowering occurs between November and January.

== Taxonomy and naming ==
Pterostylis humilis was first formally described in 1922 by Richard Rogers and the description was published in Transactions and Proceedings of the Royal Society of South Australia. The specific epithet (humilis) is a Latin word meaning "low", "on the ground", "shallow" or "poor".

== Distribution and habitat ==
This greenhood grows in montane forests of Nothofagus and in subalpine scrub. It occurs on the Volcanic Plateau and in the Egmont National Park on the North Island. On the South Island it occurs from near Nelson to near the Buller River.
