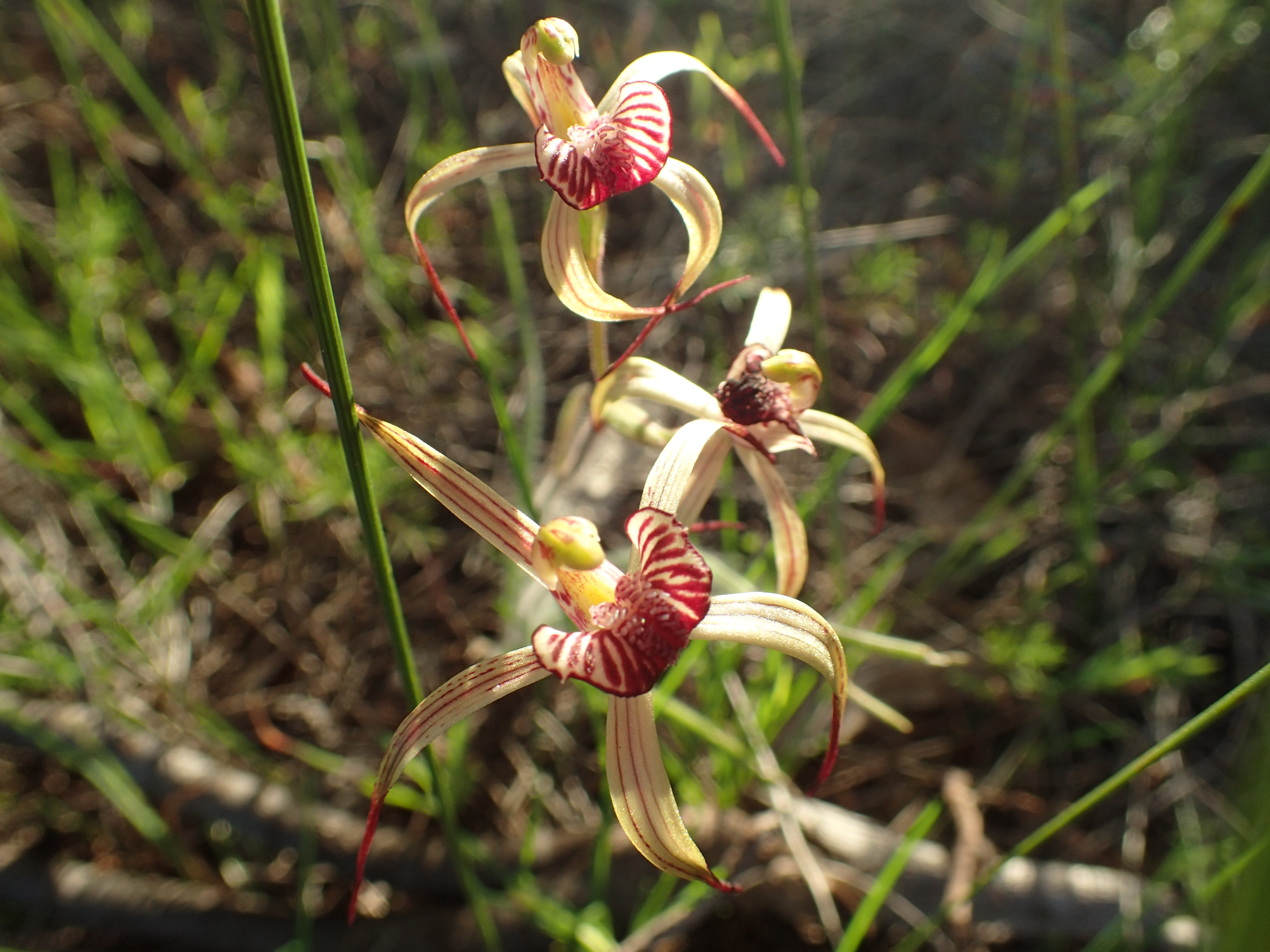
- Near Badgingarra

Scientific classification
- Kingdom: Plantae
- Clade: Embryophytes
- Clade: Tracheophytes
- Clade: Spermatophytes
- Clade: Angiosperms
- Clade: Monocots
- Order: Asparagales
- Family: Orchidaceae
- Subfamily: Orchidoideae
- Tribe: Diurideae
- Genus: Caladenia
- Species: C. radialis

Binomial name
- Caladenia radialis R.S.Rogers

Synonyms
- Calonema radiale (R.S.Rogers D.L.Jones & M.A.Clem.; Phlebochilus radialis (R.S.Rogers) Szlach.; Calonemorchis radialis (R.S.Rogers) D.L.Jones & M.A.Clem.; Jonesiopsis radialis (R.S.Rogers) D.L.Jones & M.A.Clem.

= Caladenia radialis =

Drooping spider orchid

Species of orchid

Caladenia radialis, commonly known as the drooping spider orchid, is a species of orchid endemic to the south-west of Western Australia. It has a single erect, hairy leaf and one or two red and cream-coloured flowers. In good seasons it forms clumps of up to ten plants.

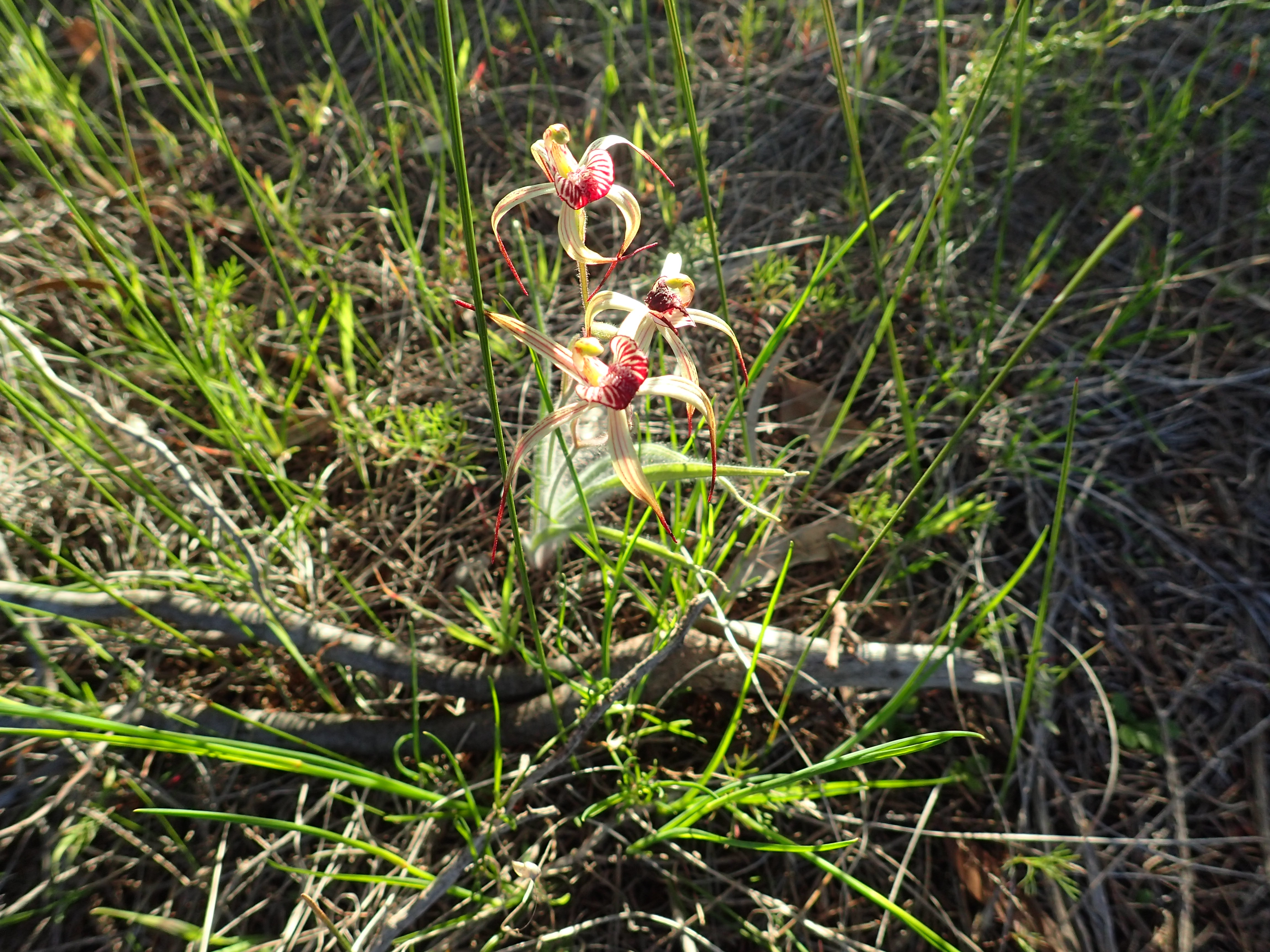
Caladenia radialis Habit

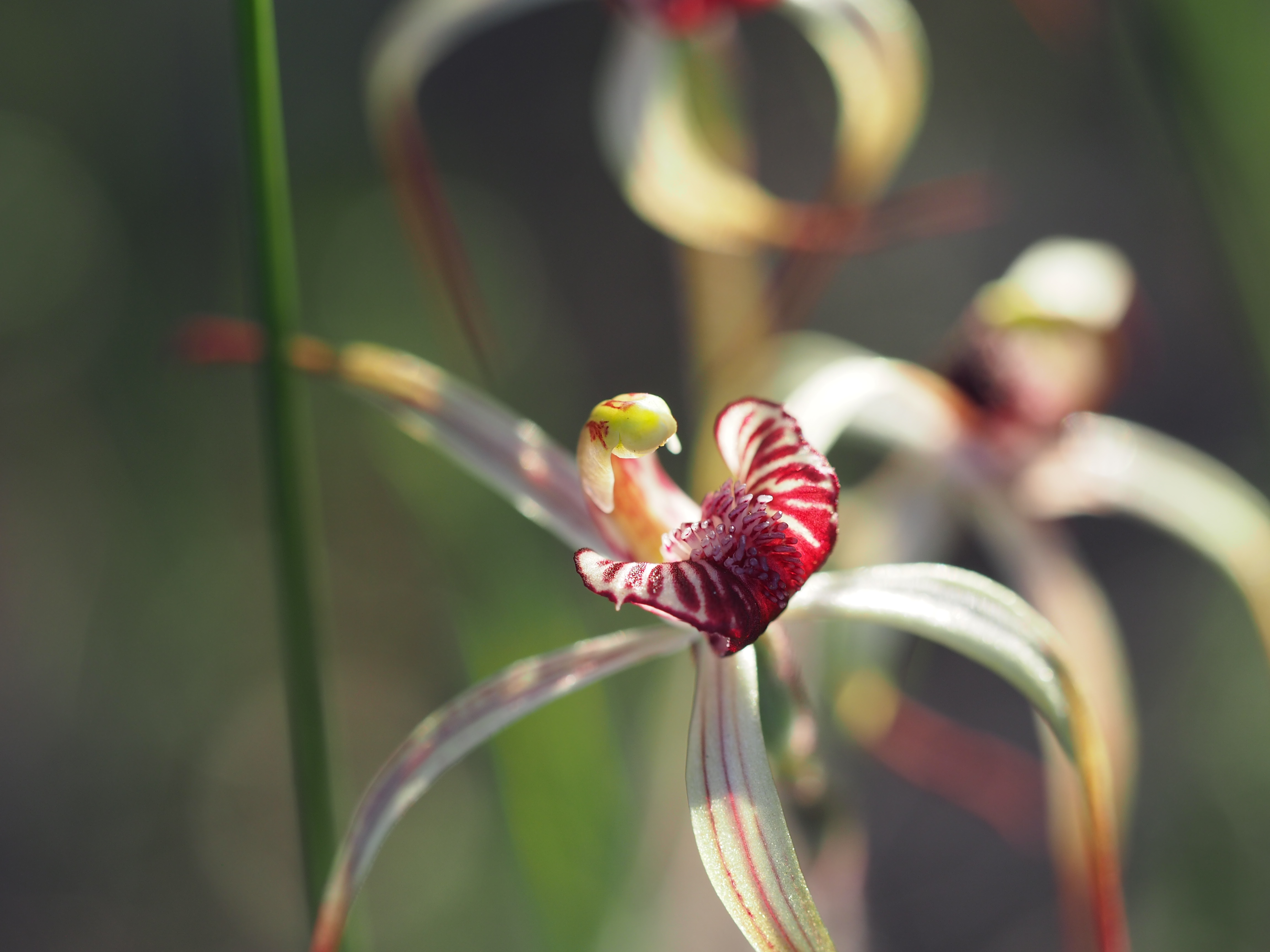
Labellum detail

== Description ==
Caladenia radialis is a terrestrial, perennial, deciduous, herb with an underground tuber and which often forms clumps of up to ten plants after good rainfall. It has a single erect, hairy leaf, 50–180 mm (2–7 in) long and about 6 mm (0.2 in) wide. One or two red and cream-coloured flowers 40–50 mm (1.6–2.0 in) long and 40–80 mm (2–3 in) wide are borne on a stalk 150–350 mm (6–10 in) tall. The sepals and petals have long, brown, drooping thread-like tips. The dorsal sepal curves forward and is 25–45 mm (1–2 in) long and about 2 mm (0.08 in) wide. The lateral sepals and petals have about the same dimensions as the dorsal sepal although the lateral sepals are slightly wider. The labellum is 12–15 mm (0.5–0.6 in) long, 8–10 mm (0.3–0.4 in) wide and cream-coloured with red lines. The sides of the labellum sometimes have a few short teeth, the tip is curled under and there is a dense band of red or cream-coloured calli along the mid-line. Flowering occurs from August to early October.

== Taxonomy and naming ==
Caladenia radialis was first described in 1927 by Richard Rogers from a specimen collected near Dowerin and the description was published in Transactions and Proceedings of the Royal Society of South Australia. The specific epithet (radialis) is derived from the Latin word radius meaning "ray", "rod" or "spoke", referring to the radiating red lines on the labellum.

== Distribution and habitat ==
The drooping spider orchid is found between the Fitzgerald River National Park and Northampton in the Avon Wheatbelt, Esperance Plains, Geraldton Sandplains, Jarrah Forest and Mallee biogeographic regions where it grows in a range of habitats including on granite outcrops and near the edges of salt lakes.

== Conservation ==
Caladenia radialis is classified as "not threatened" by the Western Australian Government Department of Parks and Wildlife.
