= Prasophyllum perangustum =

Knocklofty leek orchid

Conservation status
- Critically endangered (EPBC Act)

Scientific classification
- Kingdom: Plantae
- Clade: Tracheophytes
- Clade: Angiosperms
- Clade: Monocots
- Order: Asparagales
- Family: Orchidaceae
- Subfamily: Orchidoideae
- Tribe: Diurideae
- Subtribe: Prasophyllinae
- Genus: Prasophyllum
- Species: P. perangustum

Binomial name
- Prasophyllum perangustum D.L.Jones

Species of orchid

Prasophyllum perangustum, commonly known as the Knocklofty leek orchid, is a species of orchid endemic to Tasmania. It has a single tubular, dark green leaf and up to fifteen greenish or light brown flowers with a white labellum. It is a very rare orchid with only six plants recorded in 1993.

== Description ==
Prasophyllum perangustum is a terrestrial, perennial, deciduous, herb with an underground tuber and a single tube-shaped, dark green leaf which is 180–250 mm (7–10 in) long and 2–3 mm (0.08–0.1 in) wide near its reddish base. The free part of the leaf is 80–120 mm (3–5 in) long. Between seven and fifteen greenish or light brown flowers are loosely arranged along a flowering spike which is 60–100 mm (2–4 in) long. The flowers are 12–14 mm (0.5–0.6 in) long and 6–8 mm (0.2–0.3 in) wide and as with other leek orchids, are inverted so that the labellum is above the column rather than below it. The dorsal sepal is lance-shaped to narrow egg-shaped, 5.5–7 mm (0.2–0.3 in) long, about 3 mm (0.1 in) wide and greenish-brown with red-brown markings. The lateral sepals are linear to narrow lance-shaped, 7–8 mm (0.28–0.31 in) long, about 2 mm (0.08 in) wide and free from each other. The petals are narrow linear, 5–6 mm (0.20–0.24 in) long, about 1 mm (0.04 in) wide and greenish with a central red-brown line. The labellum is white, egg-shaped to lance-shaped, 6–7 mm (0.2–0.3 in) long, about 3 mm (0.1 in) wide and turns sharply upwards through about 90° near its middle. The edges of the upturned part of the labellum are slightly wavy and there is a thickened, fleshy green, channelled callus in its centre. Flowering occurs in November and December.

== Taxonomy and naming ==
Prasophyllum perangustum was first formally described in 1998 by David Jones from a specimen collected near Knocklofty and the description was published in Australian Orchid Research. The specific epithet (perangustum) is derived from the Latin word angustum meaning "narrow" and the prefix per- meaning "very" referring to the very narrow labellum tip and callus.

== Distribution and habitat ==
The Knocklofty leek orchid is only known from a single location near Knocklofty where it grows on steep slopes and ridges with grasses and shrubs in open forest.

== Conservation ==
Prasophyllum perangustum was last seen in 1993 when six plants were recorded. It is classed as "Endangered" under the Tasmanian Threatened Species Protection Act 1995 and as Critically Endangered under the Commonwealth Government Environment Protection and Biodiversity Conservation Act 1999 (EPBC) Act. The main threats to the population are weed invasion, inappropriate fire regimes and track maintenance.
