= Edith Coleman =

Australian naturalist, botanist, ornithologist and school teacher

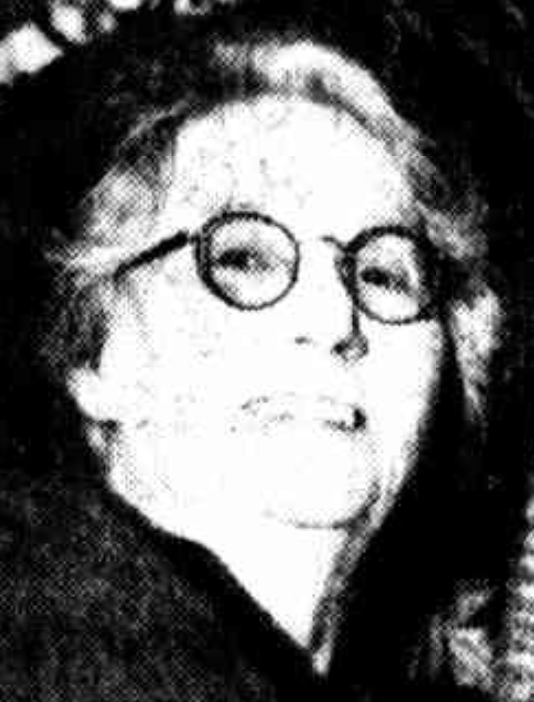
- Born: Edith Harms; 29 July 1874; Woking, Surrey, United Kingdom
- Died: 3 June 1951 (aged 76); Sorrento, Victoria, Australia
- Resting place: Sorrento Cemetery
- Known for: discovery of pseudocopulation in Australian orchids
- Spouse: James G. Coleman
- Children: Dorothy Gwynne Coleman and Gladys Winifred Thomson
- Awards: Australian Natural History Medallion
- Scientific career
- Fields: Natural history
- Author abbrev. (botany): E.Coleman

Edith Coleman (1874–1951) was an Australian naturalist and nature writer who made important observations on pollination syndromes in Australian plant species.

== Early life ==
Coleman was born Edith Harms on 29 July 1874 in Woking, Surrey. She emigrated with her family to Australia in 1887 and became a school teacher. In 1898, she married James G. Coleman, a pioneering motorist and founder of the RACV. They had two daughters, Dorothy and Gladys and moved to 'Walsham' in Blackburn, Victoria. Many of Coleman's early natural history work was conducted in the garden and bushland surrounding Walsham, as well as their cottage in Healesville and Sorrento, Victoria. She died on 3 June 1951 at Sorrento, Victoria.

== Contributions to science ==
Coleman joined the Field Naturalists Club of Victoria on 11 September 1922. She published over 350 popular and scientific articles from that time onwards in The Victorian Naturalist as well as newspapers and magazines. She published a singular book in her career about her observations on Victorian Wattles. She made significant scientific contributions to the study of many Australian species, including orchids, mistletoe, spiders, insects, birds and fish as well as papers on herbs, gardening and history.

Coleman's landmark paper on pseudocopulation in orchids resolved a long-standing mystery in orchid pollination which had puzzled many, including Charles Darwin. Her work demonstrated that, instead of producing nectar to attract pollinators, some orchid species mimicked female wasps with scent, visual and tactile cues so effectively that the male wasps preferentially copulate with (and pollinate) the orchids. Her work was republished internationally by Oxford biologist Edward Bagnall Poulton and acclaimed by Harvard entomologist Oakes Ames. She worked with and influenced many naturalists including Rica Erickson, Herman Rupp, Jean Galbraith, and Richard Sanders Rogers who named Prasophyllum colemaniae after her and her daughters.

Coleman was also an enthusiastic promoter of Australian (and English literature) in her writing and was regarded by Kate Baker as one of the foremost figures in Australian literature at the time.

== Awards ==
Coleman was awarded the Australian Natural History Medallion in 1949. She became the first woman in history to ever receive this honour.

== Selected bibliography ==
- Coleman, E. (1920). Forest Orchids. The Gum Tree, December, 5–8.
- Coleman, E. (1922). Some Autumn orchids. Victorian Naturalist, 39, 103–8.
- Coleman, E. (1926). Botanical renaissance: Forest orchids – autumn. The Age, Saturday 26, 12 June.
- Coleman, E. (1927). Pollination of the orchid Cryptostylis leptochila. Victorian Naturalist, 44, 20–2.
- Coleman, E. (1928). Pollination of Cryptostylis leptochila. Victorian Naturalist, 44, 333–40.
- Coleman, Edith (1928). "Pollination of an Australian orchid by the male ichneumonid Lissopimpla semipunctata, Kirkby". Ecological Entomology. 76 (2): 533–539. doi:10.1111/j.1365-2311.1929.tb01419.x.
- Coleman, E. (1929). Across the continent to Perth: Impression of colour and vast distances. The Argus, Saturday 23, 10 November.
- Coleman, E. (1930). The pollination of a second Australian orchid by the ichneumon Lissopimpla semipunctata Kirby (Hymenoptera, Parasitica). Proceedings of the Royal Entomological Society of London Series A General Entomology, 5(2), 15.
- Coleman, E. (1930). Pollination of some West Australian orchids. Victorian Naturalist, 46, 203–6.
- Coleman, E. (1931). Spring in Healesville. The Age, Saturday 12, 4 September.
- Coleman, E. (1931). The Teachings of Nature: Lessons from Plants and Insects. The Age, Saturday 26, 4 September.
- Coleman, E. (1933). Maternal Devotion: The Mother Scorpion-Spider's Life of Sacrifice. The Australian Women's Mirror, 9(29), 11, 47.
- Coleman, E. (1934). The Echidna in captivity. The Australian Woman's Mirror, 23, 12 October, 47.
- Coleman, Edith (1935). Come back in wattle time : an illustrated handbook to our Australian wattles. National Handbooks. Vol. 13. Melbourne: Robertson & Mullens.
- Coleman, E. (1937). Camouflage of the Spiny-cheeked Honeyeater. Emu, 37(4), 313–315. doi:http://dx.doi.org/10.1071/MU937313
- Coleman, E. (1937). Nest Hygiene. Emu, 37(1), 68–69. doi:http://dx.doi.org/10.1071/MU937060j
- Coleman, E. (1938). Further notes on the Mountain Grasshopper, Acridopeza reticulata. Victorian Naturalist, 55, 119–22.
- Coleman, E. (1938). Further observations on the pseudocopulation of the male Lissopimpla semipunctata Kirby (Hymenoptera, Parasitica) with the Australian orchid Cryptostylis leptochila Proceedings of the Royal Entomological Society of London, 13, 82–3.
- Coleman, E. (1938). The huntsman spider (Isopeda immanis): Courtship, egg-laying and emergence of spiderlings. The Australian Zoologist, 9, 180–90.
- Coleman, E. (1938). Magic rain carpets the 'inland': Many and brave are the flowers of the inland - blooms of a 'desert' that is no desert. The Argus, Saturday 11, 4 June,6.
- Coleman, E. (1938). One man's meat. Walkabout, 4(11), 36–8
- Coleman, E. (1939). Leaflessness in Orchids (Cryptostylis). Victorian Naturalist, 56, 48.
- Coleman, E. (1942). Notes on the Great Brown Stick-Insect: Part I - Development of eggs and young. Victorian Naturalist, 59, 46.
- Coleman, E. (1944). Clustering of Wood-Swallows. Victorian Naturalist, 61, 44.
- Coleman, E. (1944). A new Victorian cricket. Victorian Naturalist, 60, 144.
- Coleman, E. (1945). The late Lt. Col. Bede Theodoric Goadby (WA botanist). Victorian Naturalist, 62, 30.
- Coleman, E. (1945). Miss G. Nokes and Calochilus imberbis, Victorian Naturalist, 62, 108.
- Coleman, E. (1945). Parthenogenesis in Phasmids. Victorian Naturalist, 61, 180.
- Coleman, E. (1946). Foods of the tawny frogmouth. Victorian Naturalist, 63, 111–5.
- Coleman, E. (1946). The horse radish. The Australasian journal of pharmacy, 27(317), 381
- Coleman, E. (1948). Colour breeding in budgerigars. Victorian Naturalist, 64, 214.
- Coleman, E. (1948). Planning the herb garden. Your Garden, 1(2), 22–23.
- Coleman, E. (1948). Strewing herbs: Meadow Sweet or Bridewort. Your Garden, 1(8), 42–43.
- Coleman, E. (1949). Vascular anatomy of orchid flowers. Victorian Naturalist, 65, 282–3.
- Coleman, E. (1950). Further notes on the mistletoe. Victorian Naturalist, 66, 191–4.
- Coleman, E. (1950). George Bass, Victoria's first explorer and naturalist. Victorian Naturalist, 67, 3.
- Coleman, Edith (May 1950). "George Bass, Victoria's first explorer and naturalist". The Victorian Naturalist. 67: 3–9.
- Coleman, E. (1951). The late Professor Oakes Ames (American orchidologist). Victorian Naturalist, 67, 184.
- Coleman, E. (1951). Winter visitors to a Blairgowrie cottage. Victorian Naturalist, 68, 47–8.
