= Richard Sanders Rogers =

Australian medical doctor

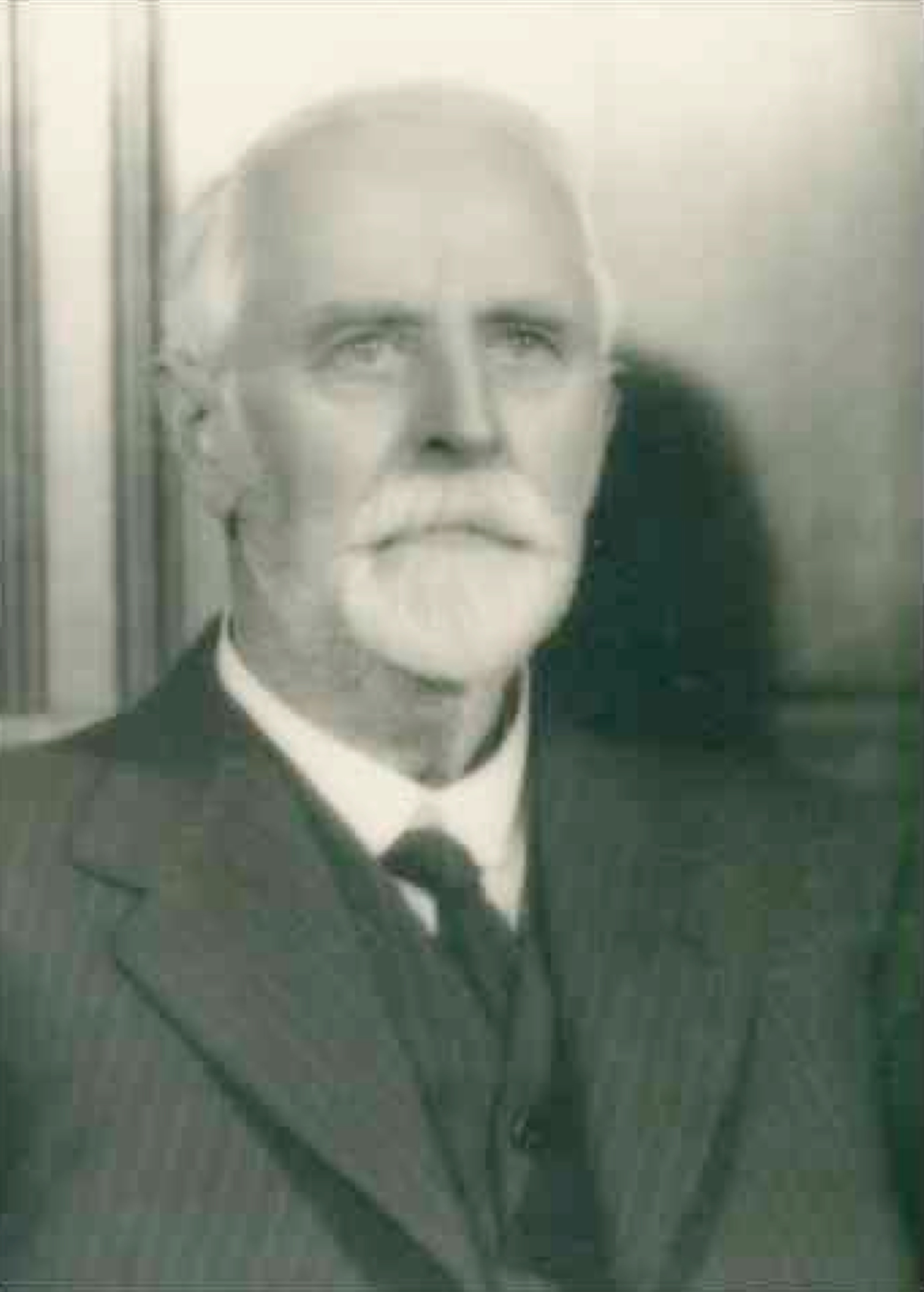
- Richard Sanders Rogers (in 1932)
- Born: 2 December 1861; Adelaide, Australia
- Died: 28 March 1942 (aged 80); Adelaide
- Citizenship: Australian
- Education: University of Edinburgh
- Scientific career
- Fields: Medicine, Botany

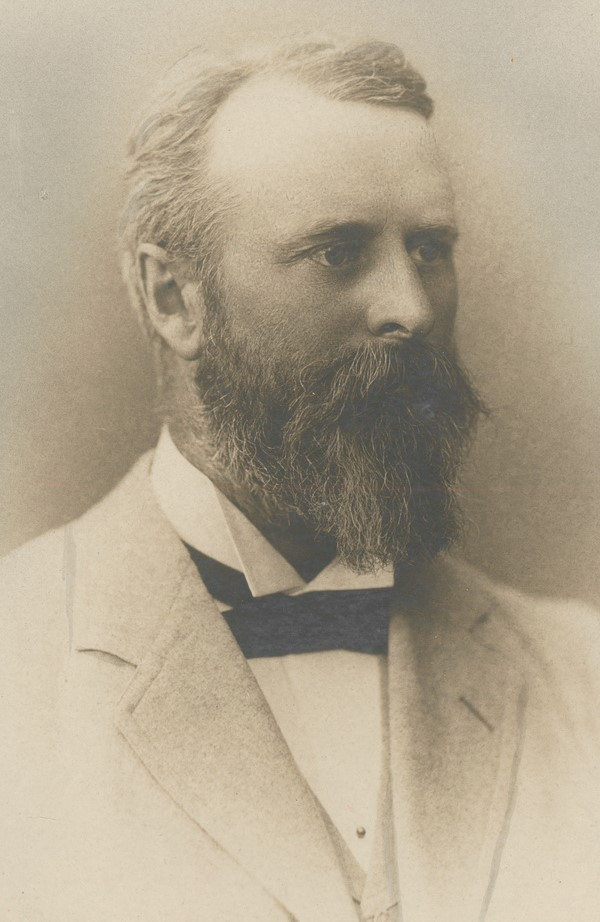
Rogers in 1890

Richard Sanders Rogers (2 December 1861 – 28 March 1942) was a distinguished Australian medical doctor, and world authority on Australasian orchids. He described over 80 Australian orchid species, three from New Zealand and 30 from New Guinea as well as three new genera including one from New Zealand. He was a consulting physician at the Adelaide Hospital and a member of its board. He may have been the first to practise hypnotism during surgery, allowing him to remove a cyst from a woman's breast without anaesthetics "while she was still awake and talking to assistants and witnesses standing nearby."

== Biography ==
Rogers was the son of Joseph Rogers and his wife Ann Childers Rogers (née Williams) and was one of their nine children. He was educated at Pulteney Street School, now Pulteney Grammar School and the University of Adelaide, graduating B.A. with first class honours in 1881. He taught at Prince Alfred College, Adelaide before earning a scholarship to study medicine at the University of Edinburgh where he graduated M.D. in 1887. In that year he also married Jean Scott Patterson in Edinburgh before returning to Australia and starting to practise medicine as a general practitioner.

During the First World War Rogers directed the Keswick Base Hospital, a military hospital in Adelaide, with the rank of lieutenant-colonel. He was appointed to the boards of the Public Library, Museum and Art Gallery (1929–31) and the Justices' Association (1914–15). He was also a member of the South Australian Literary Societies' Union, and its president from 1909 to 1911.

== Contributions to medicine ==
Rogers was a consulting physician at the Royal Adelaide Hospital from 1897 until his death, a member of its board and of the South Australian Medical Board and a member of the Royal Australasian College of Physicians. He was superintendent of Enfield Receiving House (a psychiatric hospital) and Northfield Mental Hospital and consulting psychiatrist to all State mental institutions. As well as developing an interest in hypnotism and sometimes using it in his medical practice to improve patient well–being, he was the first doctor in South Australia to import and use an X–ray machine and to encourage others to use it in medical diagnosis and surgery. He was appointed Lecturer in Forensic Medicine at the University of Adelaide in 1919, a position he held until his retirement at the age of 78 in December 1939.

== Contributions to science ==
In his spare time, Rogers studied orchids and became a world authority on Australasian species. In spite of having no formal training in botany, he published 25 papers on the subject between 1906 and 1932, collected more than 5,200 specimens, built his own herbarium and corresponded with orchid experts in England, Holland and America. He was assisted for nearly 30 years by the Adelaide artist, Rosa Fiveash in the drawing of the many species of orchid that he located and identified. In 1905 he was elected a Fellow of the Royal Society of South Australia and served as its Vice President (1914) and President (1920) and in 1924 was elected a fellow of the Linnaean Society. Rogers corresponded with other orchidologist such as Herman Rupp, Edith Coleman, William Nicholls, Cyril Wright and Rudolf Schlechter and the descriptions of many species, named by others, were influenced by him.

Two orchids have been named for him (Pterostylis rogersii E.Coleman and Prasophyllum rogersii Rupp). Some of the many orchids described and named by Rogers include:

- Caladenia pectinata R.S Rogers
- Caladenia radialis R.S.Rogers
- Prasophyllum constrictum R.S.Rogers
- Thelymitra azurea R.S.Rogers
- Pterostylis alpina R.S.Rogers

== External sources ==
Rogers, Richard S. "An Introduction to the study of South Australian orchids". Government Printer, South Terrace, Adelaide.
