= Sinus (botany) =

Space or indentation, usually on a leaf

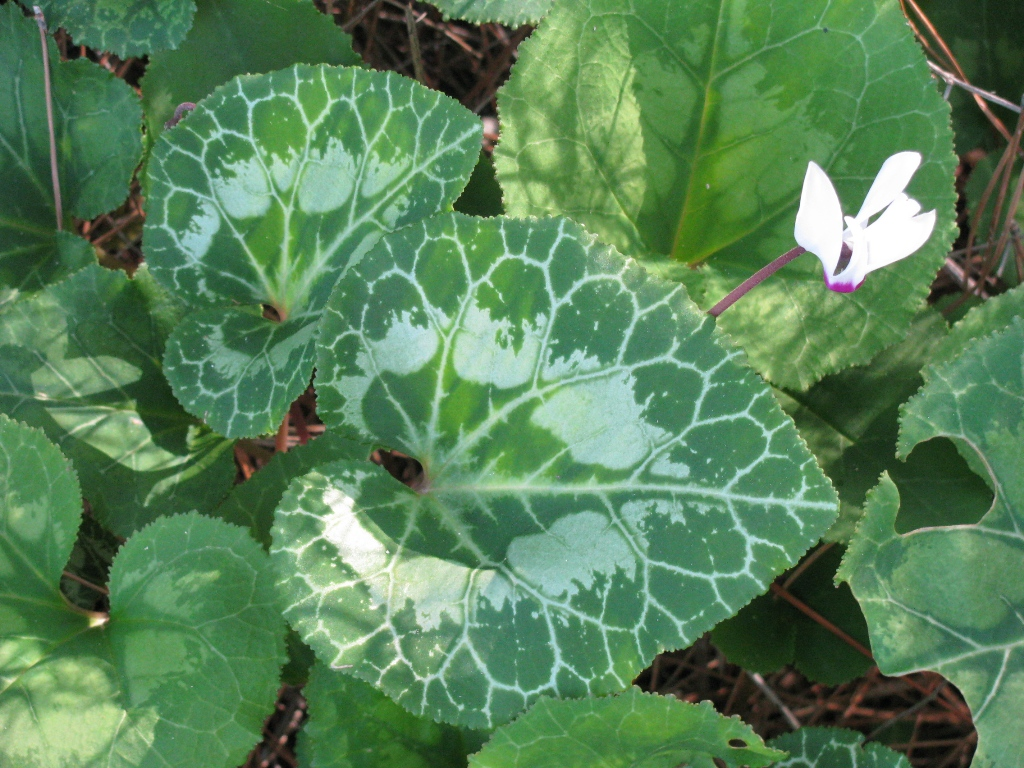
The area between the two lobes of this Cyclamen persicum leaf is a sinus.

In botany, a sinus is a space or indentation between two lobes or teeth, usually on a leaf. The term is also used in mycology. For example, one of the defining characteristics of North American species in the Morchella elata clade of morels is the presence of a sinus where the cap attaches to the stipe.

== See also ==
- Leaf shape
- Sulcus (morphology)
