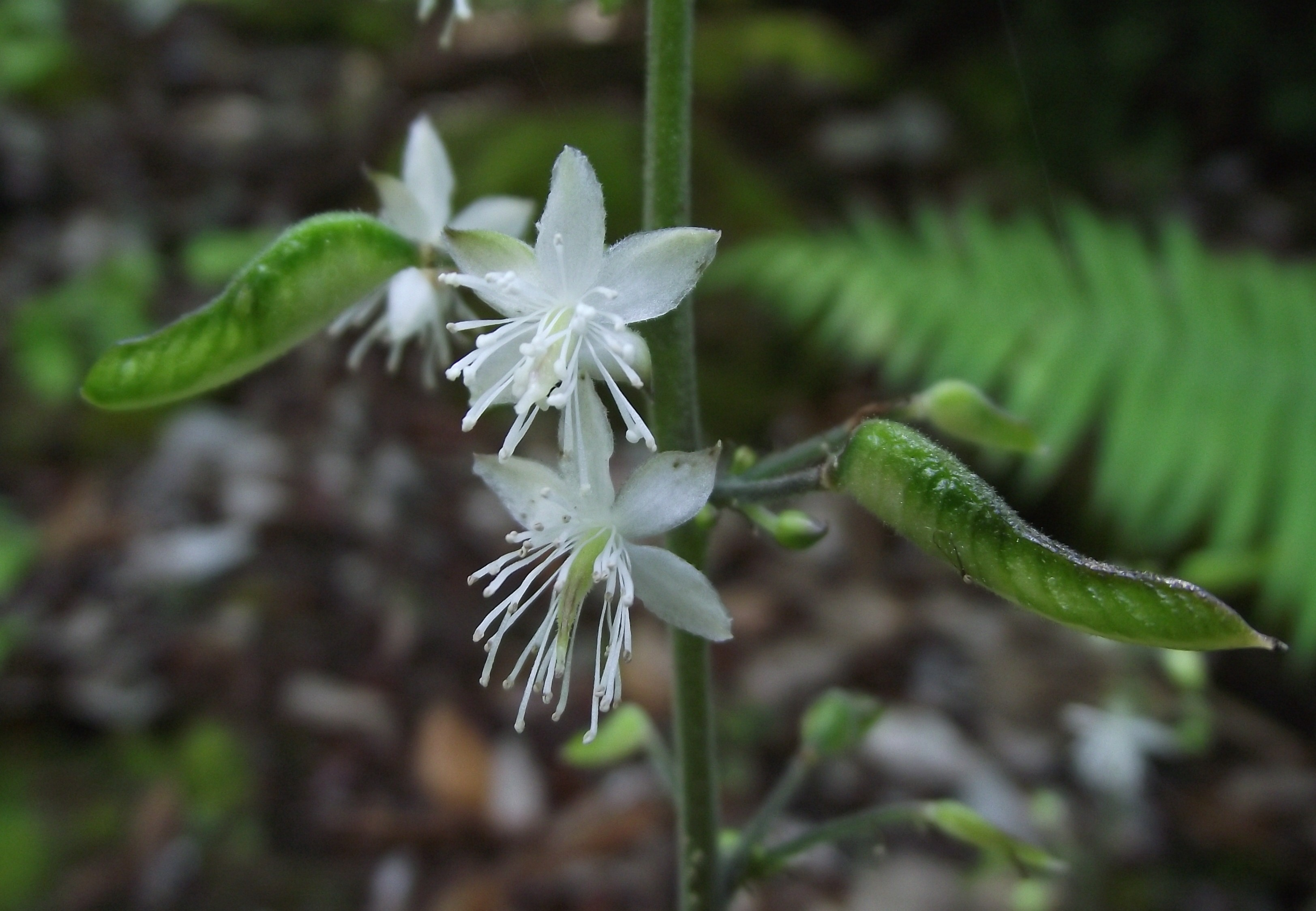
- Beesia deltophylla

Scientific classification
- Kingdom: Plantae
- Clade: Tracheophytes
- Clade: Angiosperms
- Clade: Eudicots
- Order: Ranunculales
- Family: Ranunculaceae
- Subfamily: Ranunculoideae
- Tribe: Cimicifugeae
- Genus: Beesia; Balf.f. & W.W.Sm.

Species
- Beesia calthifolia (Maxim. ex Oliv.) Ulbr.; Beesia deltophylla C.Y.Wu

= Beesia =

Genus of flowering plants

Beesia is a genus of flowering plants in the buttercup family. It was named in 1915 after the plant nursery firm Bees of Chester, who financed the plant hunting trips of George Forrest and Frank Kingdon-Ward in China.

== Species ==
There are two species of Beesia:

- Beesia calthifolia, which is native to the following WGSRPD floristic regions: North-Central China, South-Central China, Southeast China, East Himalaya, and Myanmar.
- Beesia deltophylla, which is native to southeastern Tibet.

== Description ==
=== Morphology ===
Beesia is an evergreen perennial and grows as a dense basal rosette of heart-shaped leaves with delicate serrated edges. Leaves are soft and waxy; new growth of B. deltophylla flushes dark green to black, while B. calthifolia is a lighter shade of green. Small white flowers bloom mid-summer off an upright spike. Flowers are star-like: although Beesia flowers do not have petals, they do have 5 elliptic, petal-like sepals. Flowers also have many stamens.

=== Phytochemistry ===
A class of organic molecules termed beesiosides have been isolated from Beesia plants. Beesiosides are cycloartane glycosides (a type of triterpene that forms a sugar and a non-sugar upon hydrolysis).

== Phylogeny ==
Anemonopsis, a monotypic genus in the Ranunculaceae native to Japan, is a sister group to Beesia. Eranthis and Actaea are also closely related to Beesia.

== Uses ==
=== Ornamental ===
Beesia is easily divided or grown from seed, and can be grown in USDA hardiness zones 6a to 8b. It grows best in partial shade or filtered light in rich, moist soil.

=== Medicinal ===
Beesia rhizomes are used in Chinese herbal medicine as a treatment for rheumatoid arthritis and influenza.
