= Inland leek orchid =

Inland leek orchid is a common name for several plants and may refer to:

- Prasophyllum maccannii
- Prasophyllum macrotys
