= List of wildflowers in Indiana =

There is a large variety of wildflowers native to Indiana. The following list is an incomplete list of native perennial flowering plant species.

== Wildflowers by scientific name ==
- Achillea millefolium, common yarrow
- Acorus calamus, sweet flag
- Actaea pachypoda, white baneberry
- Aquilegia canadensis, eastern red columbine
- Arisaema triphyllum, jack-in-the-pulpit
- Aruncus dioicus, goat's beard
- Asarum canadense, wild ginger
- Asclepias tuberosa, butterfly weed
- Asclepias syriaca, common milkweed
- Aster novae-angliae, New England aster
- Baptisia lactea, white false indigo
- Caltha palustris, marsh-marigold
- Caulophyllum thalictroides, blue cohosh (barberry)
- Chelone glabra, white turtlehead
- Cimicifuga racemosa, black snakeroot
- Dicentra cucullaria, Dutchman's breeches
- Dodecatheon meadia, eastern shooting star
- Eupatorium fistulosum, Joe-Pye weed
- Eupatorium perfoliatum, boneset
- Euphorbia corollata, flowering spurge
- Filipendula rubra, queen-of-the-prairie
- Geranium maculatum, wild geranium
- Hypericum, goatweed
- Iris cristata, crested iris
- Iris pseudacorus, yellow iris
- Helianthus tuberosus, Jerusalem artichoke
- Liatris spicata, prairie gay feather
- Lobelia siphilitica, great blue lobelia
- Lysimachia nummularia, moneywort
- Lysimachia punctata, large yellow loosestrife
- Mertensia virginica, Virginia bluebells
- Monarda didyma, crimson beebalm
- Phlox divaricata, wild blue phlox
- Polemonium reptans, Jacob's ladder
- Polygonatum biflorum, Solomon's seal
- Rudbeckia hirta, black-eyed Susan
- Rudbeckia triloba, brown-eyed susan
- Sanguinaria canadensis, bloodroot
- Sedum ternatum, woodland stonecrop
- Stylophorum diphyllum, woods-poppy
- Tiarella cordifolia, heartleaf foamflower
- Trillium, Trillium
- Vernonia noveboracensis, New York ironweed
- Viola papilionacea, blue violet
- Xanthorhiza simplicissima, yellowroot
- Yucca glauca, Great Plains yucca

== Bibliography ==
- Homoya, Michael Allison. Orchids of Indiana. United States: Indiana University Press, 1993.
- Runkel, Sylvan T.., Bull, Alvin F.. Wildflowers of Indiana Woodlands. United States: Iowa State University Press, 1994.
- Wampler, Fred., Wampler, Maryrose. Wildflowers of Indiana. United States: Indiana University Press, 1988.
- Yatskievych, Kay. Field Guide to Indiana Wildflowers. United States: Indiana University Press, 2000.
