= Eupithecia immundata =

Scientific classification
- Kingdom: Animalia
- Phylum: Arthropoda
- Clade: Pancrustacea
- Class: Insecta
- Order: Lepidoptera
- Family: Geometridae
- Genus: Eupithecia
- Species: E. immundata

Binomial name
- Eupithecia immundata (Lienig, 1846)

Synonyms
- Larentia immundata Lienig, 1846; Eupithecia argillacearia Herrich-Schaffer, 1848; Eupithecia reikjavikaria Staudinger, 1871

Species of moth

Eupithecia immundata is a moth of the family Geometridae. It is known from the mountainous areas of Europe, as well as northern Europe.

The wingspan is 17–20 mm. There is one generation per year with adults on wing in June.

The larvae feed on Actaea spicata. Larvae can be found from the end of June to August. They live in the fruit of their host plant. It overwinters as a pupa.
