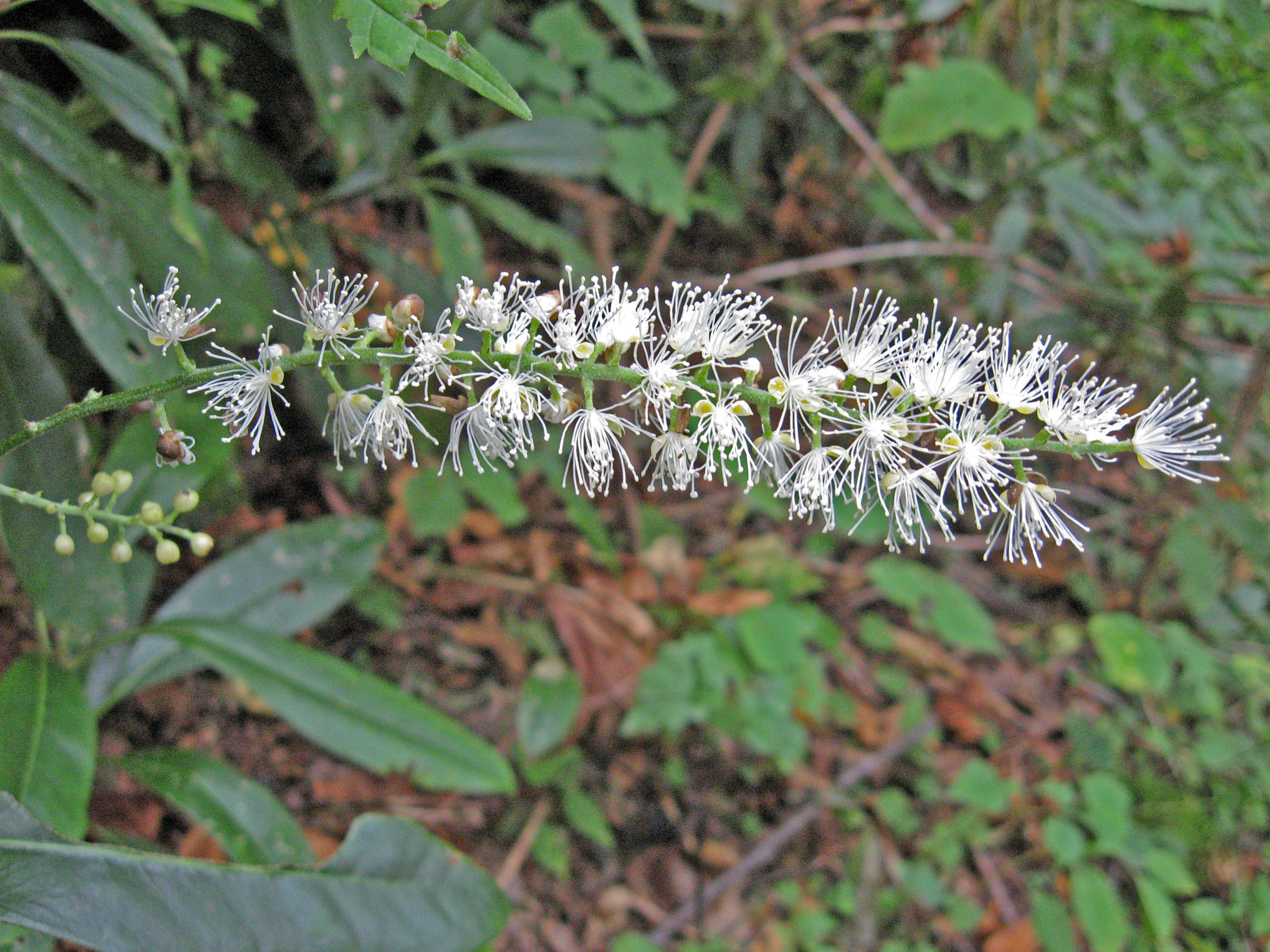

Conservation status
- Apparently Secure (NatureServe)

Scientific classification
- Kingdom: Plantae
- Clade: Tracheophytes
- Clade: Angiosperms
- Clade: Eudicots
- Order: Ranunculales
- Family: Ranunculaceae
- Genus: Actaea
- Species: A. podocarpa

Binomial name
- Actaea podocarpa DC.

Synonyms
- Cimicifuga americana

= Actaea podocarpa =

Species of plant

Actaea podocarpa, the mountain bugbane or mountain black-cohosh, is a species of flowering plant in the buttercup family. It is native to the eastern United States, where it is found in the Appalachian Mountains, with a disjunct population in Illinois. It is found in rich, mesic forests often in boulder-strewn coves.

Actaea podocarpa is a large perennial herb. It is one of the later flowering of the eastern Actaea, producing white flowers in summer through fall.

Both it and Actaea rubifolia bear resemblance to black cohosh, which, due to its vasodilation properties, is valuable for the treatment of menopause symptoms; harvesters of black cohosh sometimes mistake A. podocarpa for black cohosh, accidentally harvesting it.
