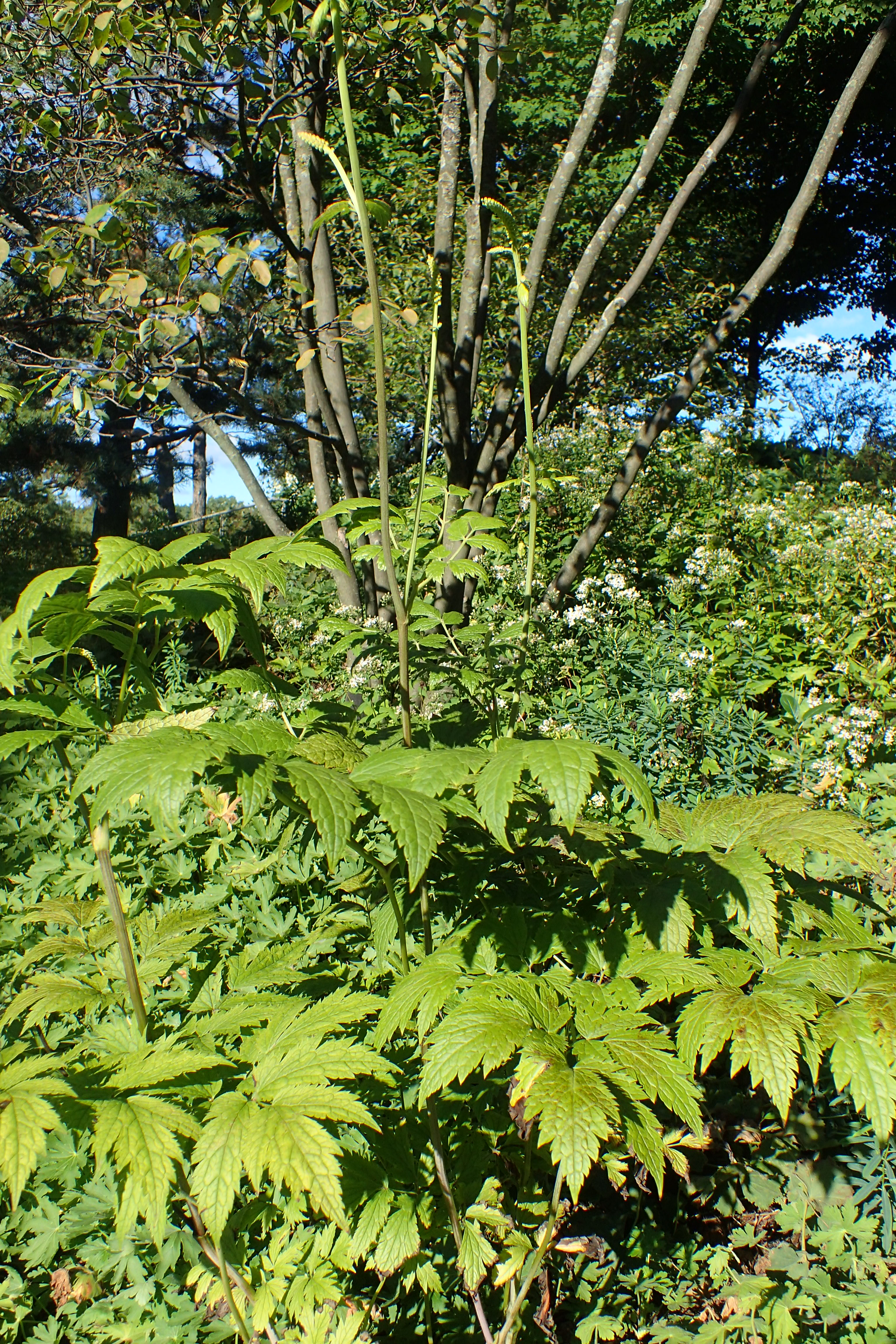

Conservation status
- Imperiled (NatureServe)

Scientific classification
- Kingdom: Plantae
- Clade: Tracheophytes
- Clade: Angiosperms
- Clade: Eudicots
- Order: Ranunculales
- Family: Ranunculaceae
- Genus: Actaea
- Species: A. arazonica

Binomial name
- Actaea arazonica (S. Watson) J. Compton

Synonyms
- Cimicifuga arizonica

= Actaea arizonica =

Species of flowering plant

Actaea arizonica is a species of flowering plant in the buttercup family known by the common name Arizona bugbane. It is endemic to Arizona in the United States, where it occurs in Coconino, Gila, and Yavapai Counties. Like some other species in genus Actaea, this plant was formerly included in the genus Cimicifuga.

This rhizomatous perennial herb produces hairless stems up to 1.5 to 2 meters tall. The leaves are each made up of triple-lobed, toothed leaflets up to 17.5 centimeters long by 12.5 wide. They are borne on long petioles up to 35 centimeters in length. The inflorescence is a panicle with several long branches, growing erect or leaning. The flowers have five sepals, two of which are greenish and three of which are cream in color. There are sometimes white petals as well, but these are often absent. Flowering occurs in July and August. There are many stamens in each flower. The flowers are pollinated by three species of bumblebee, Bombus occidentalis, Bombus morrisoni, and Bombus huntii. If the flowers are not pollinated by insects, or if pollination is prevented, for example, by a heavy rain, the flowers undergo abortion. The fruit is a follicle that has "a bottle-brush appearance," and "the seeds resemble furry little bugs."

This plant is endemic to central Arizona, where it grows in the ecotone between coniferous forest and the riparian zone. The elevation is about 5300–7000 feet. Some plants grow in canyons and some grow in very moist habitat such as seeps and springs on mountain slopes. The soils are rich with humus and are well-shaded. The type locality is Bill Williams Mountain in Coconino County. It shares its habitat with the Mexican spotted owl (Strix occidentalis lucida).
