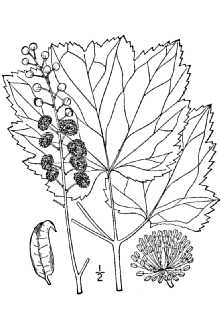

Conservation status
- Vulnerable (NatureServe)

Scientific classification
- Kingdom: Plantae
- Clade: Tracheophytes
- Clade: Angiosperms
- Clade: Eudicots
- Order: Ranunculales
- Family: Ranunculaceae
- Genus: Actaea
- Species: A. rubifolia

Binomial name
- Actaea rubifolia (Kearney) Kartesz

Synonyms
- Cimicifuga rubifolia Kearney

= Actaea rubifolia =

Species of buttercup

Actaea rubifolia, commonly known as Appalachian black cohosh or Appalachian bugbane, is a species of flowering plant in the buttercup family. The plant does well in alkaline soils and mature forests. The "bugbane" in the name refers to its flowers' unpleasant smell, which can repel insects. It is poisonous if consumed by humans.

The plant produces flowers in the early fall from August to October, and is distinctly identifiable by its large stamens and reduced white petals.

The species is vulnerable to extinction; small populations exist in Tennessee, Virginia, Alabama, and the lower Ohio River Valley.

Both Actaea rubifolia and Actaea podocarpa bear resemblance to black cohosh, which, due to its vasodilation properties, is valuable for the treatment of menopause symptoms; harvesters of black cohosh sometimes mistake A. podocarpa for black cohosh, accidentally harvesting it.
