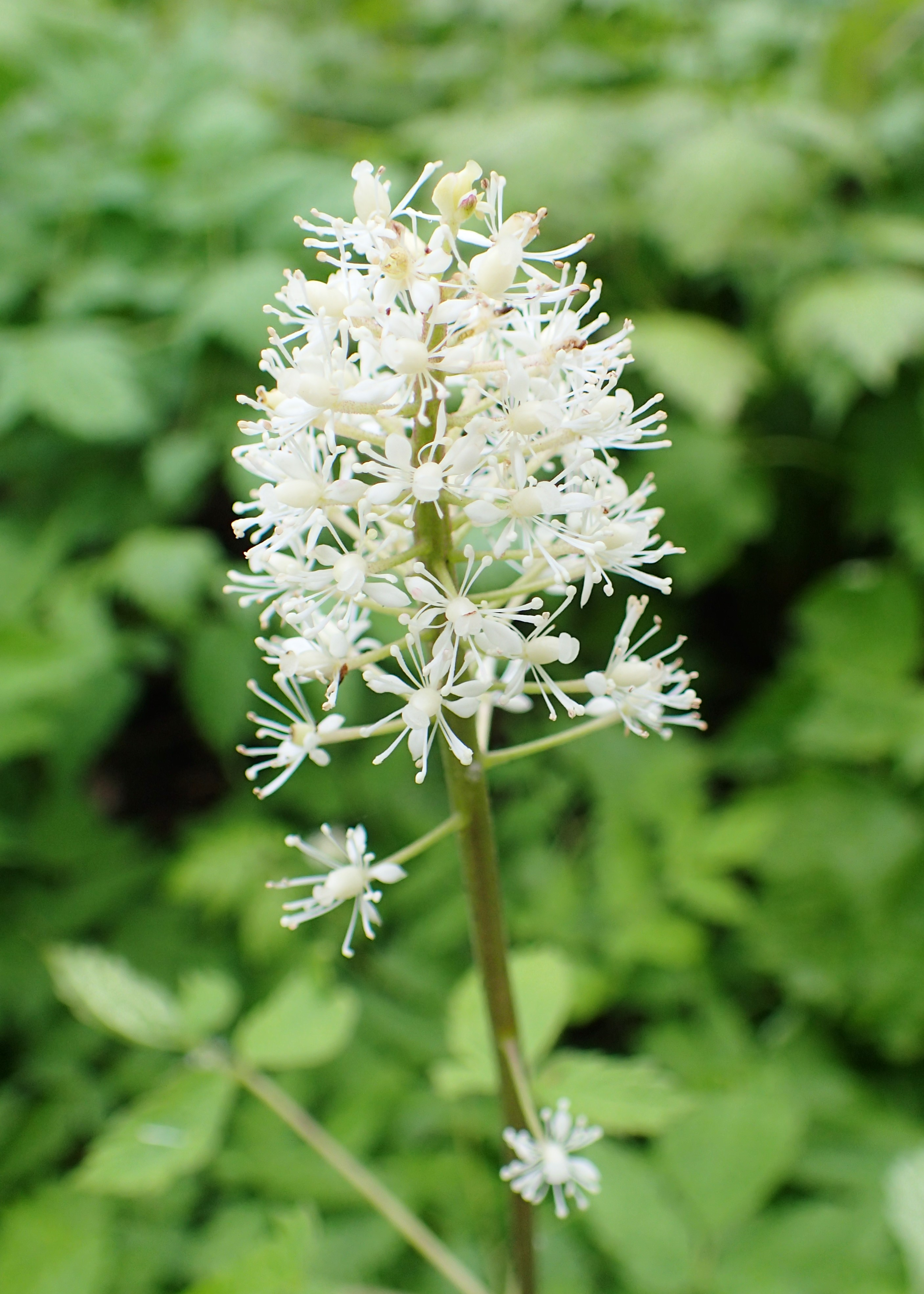

Conservation status
- Secure (NatureServe)

Scientific classification
- Kingdom: Plantae
- Clade: Tracheophytes
- Clade: Angiosperms
- Clade: Eudicots
- Order: Ranunculales
- Family: Ranunculaceae
- Genus: Actaea
- Species: A. rubra

Binomial name
- Actaea rubra (Aiton) Willd.

Subspecies
- Actaea rubra subsp. arguta

= Actaea rubra =

Species of flowering plant

Actaea rubra, the red baneberry or chinaberry, is a poisonous herbaceous flowering plant in the family Ranunculaceae, native to North America.

== Description ==
It is a perennial herb that grows 40 to 80 cm (16 to 31 in) tall.

The leaves are coarsely toothed with deeply lobed margins. Plants commonly have hairy veins on the undersides of the foliage. Each stem will have either three leaves that branch near the top, or will have three compound leaves and one upright flowering stalk from one point on the main central stem.

Plants produce one to a few ternately branched stems which bear clusters of flowers having 3 to 5 sepals that are petal-like and obovate in shape and remain after flowering. The petals are deciduous, falling away after flowering is done. They are clawed at the base and 2.5 to 4 mm (0.10 to 0.16 in) long and spatulate to obovate in shape. Flowers have numerous stamens and they are white in color.

After flowering green berries are produced. The fruits are ellipsoid shaped berries containing several seeds.

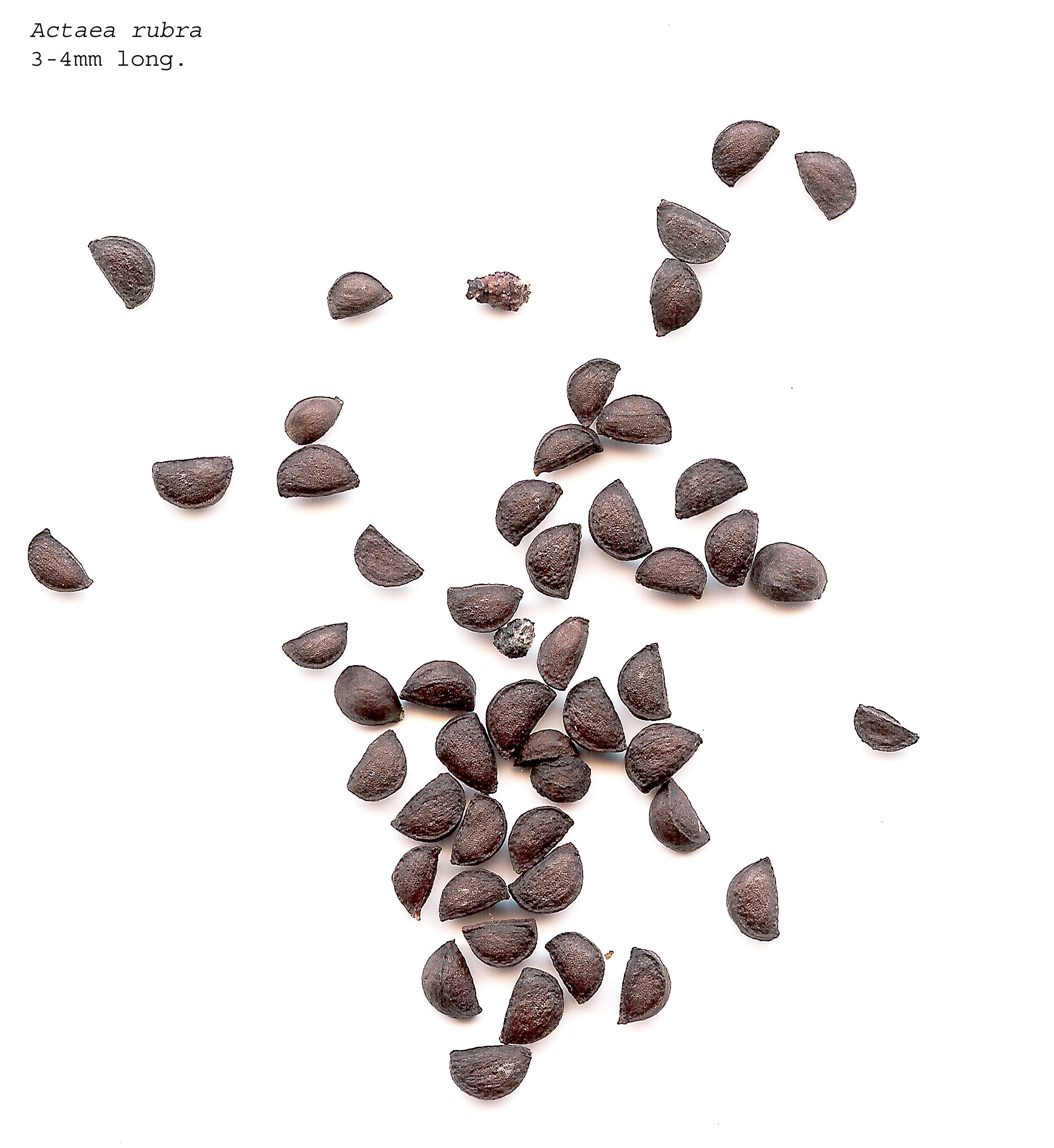
Seeds

In mid to late summer, the berries turn bright red, or white in forma neglecta. The berries also have a black dot on them.

== Distribution and habitat ==
They are found growing in shady areas with moist to wet soils, open forest or dry slopes in much of North America except for Greenland, Nunavut, Mexico, Texas, and the south-eastern United States. In Alaska it ranges from the Kenai Peninsula, through Kodiak Island, Bristol Bay, and up the Yukon River.

In 2016 NatureServe evaluated Actaea rubra as globally secure (G5). In addition, it has a status of apparently secure (S4) in Iowa, Labrador, Montana, Nebraska, the Northwest Territories, Prince Edward Island, and Wyoming. They have given it the status of locally vulnerable (S3) in Arizona, Illinois, and the Yukon Territory, imperiled (S2) in Ohio and Pennsylvania, and critically imperiled (S1) in Indiana and Rhode Island.

== Ecology ==
Plants are slow growing and take a few years to grow large enough to flower. The western subspecies is ssp. arguta, and the northern subspecies is ssp. rubra. These subspecies are not well differentiated, and in many locations, each grades in to the other over much of their ranges. The foliage is rarely consumed by grazing animals. The poisonous berries are harmless to birds, the plants' primary seed disperser.

== Uses ==
This plant is grown in shade gardens for its attractive berries and upright clump forming habit.

Native Americans have traditionally used the juice from the fruits of various baneberry species to poison arrows.

== Toxicity ==
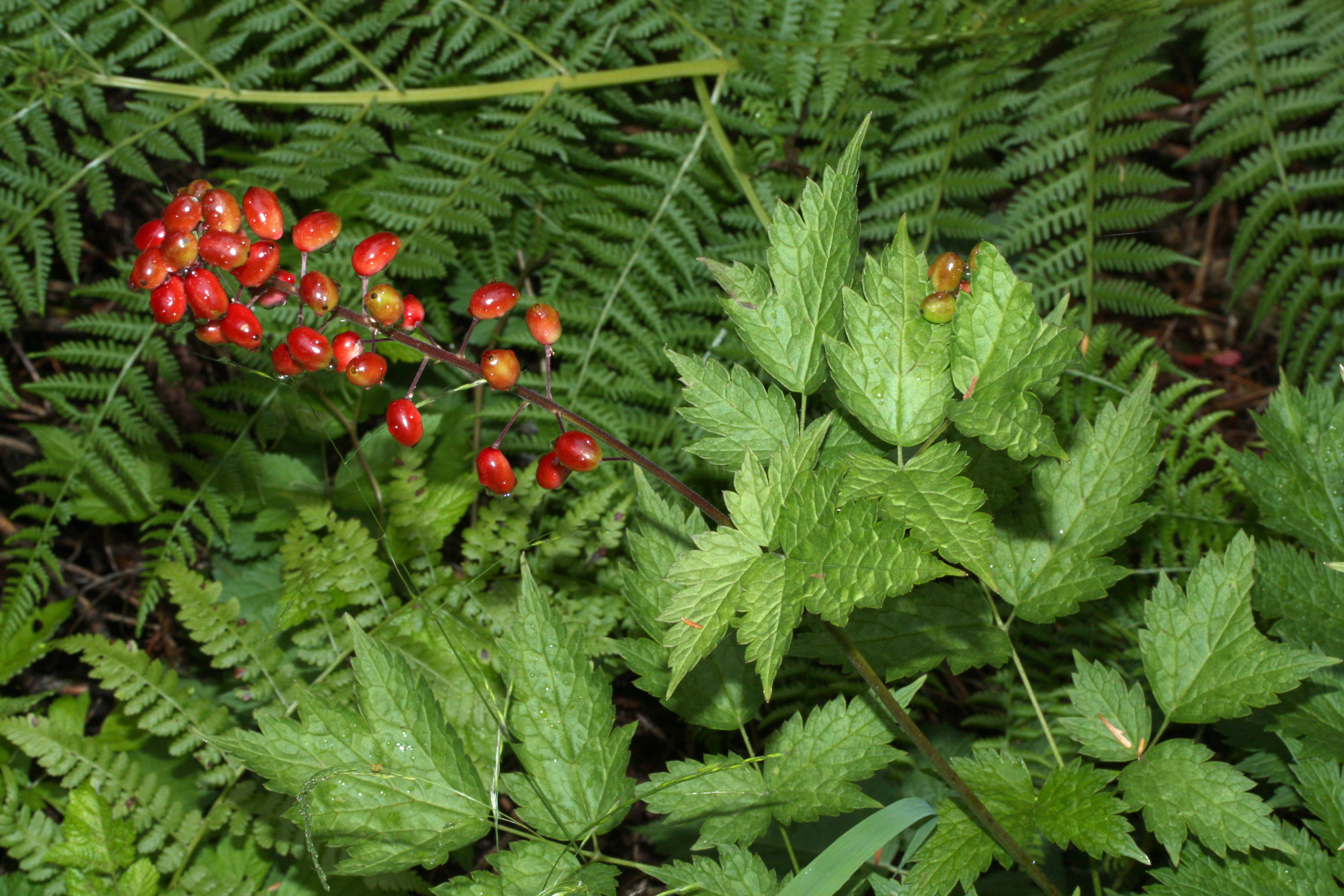
Berries and foliage in Mount Baker-Snoqualmie National Forest

All parts of the plant are poisonous. However, accidental poisoning is not likely since the berries are extremely bitter.

The berries are the most toxic part of the plant. A healthy adult will experience poisoning from as few as six berries. Ingestion of the berries causes nausea, dizziness, increased pulse and severe gastrointestinal discomfort. The toxins can also have an immediate sedative effect on the cardiac muscle tissue possibly leading to cardiac arrest if introduced into the bloodstream. As few as two berries may be fatal to a child.

The fruits and foliage contain ranunculin, and are often reported to contain protoanemonin. The plant also contains berberine.

All parts of the plant contain an irritant oil that is most concentrated within the roots and berries.

The roots contain β-sitosterol glucoside.

There have been no reported cases of severe poisoning or deaths in North America, but children have been fatally poisoned by its European relative A. spicata. It is claimed that poisoning is unlikely from eating the fruits of this species also.

This plant closely resembles mountain sweetroot (Osmorhiza chilensis), and can be confused with it; however, red baneberry lacks the strong anise-like "spicy celery" odor of mountain sweetroot.

The following illustrates a non-fatal case of experimental self-intoxication produced by the ingestion of fruit from Actaea rubra. The onset of symptoms began within 30 minutes.

"At first there was a most extraordinary pyrotechnic display of blue objects of all sizes and tints, circular with irregular edges; as one became interested in the spots a heavy weight was lowered on the top of the head and remained there, while sharp pains shot through the temples.

Then suddenly the mind became confused and there was a total disability to recollect anything distinctly or arrange ideas with any coherency. On an attempt to talk, wrong names were given to objects, and although at the same time the mind knew mistakes were made in speech, the words seemed to utter themselves independently.

For a few minutes there was great dizziness, the body seeming to swing off into space, while the blue spots changed to dancing sparks of fire. The lips and throat became parched and the latter somewhat constricted; swallowing was rather difficult; there was intense burning in the stomach with gaseous eructations, followed by sharp colicky pains in the abdomen and also pain across the back over the kidneys. The pulse rose to 125, was irregular, wiry, tense; the heart fluttered most unpleasantly.

These symptoms lasted about an hour and were followed by a feeling of great weariness, but in three hours from the time of taking the dose all seemed to be again normal".
