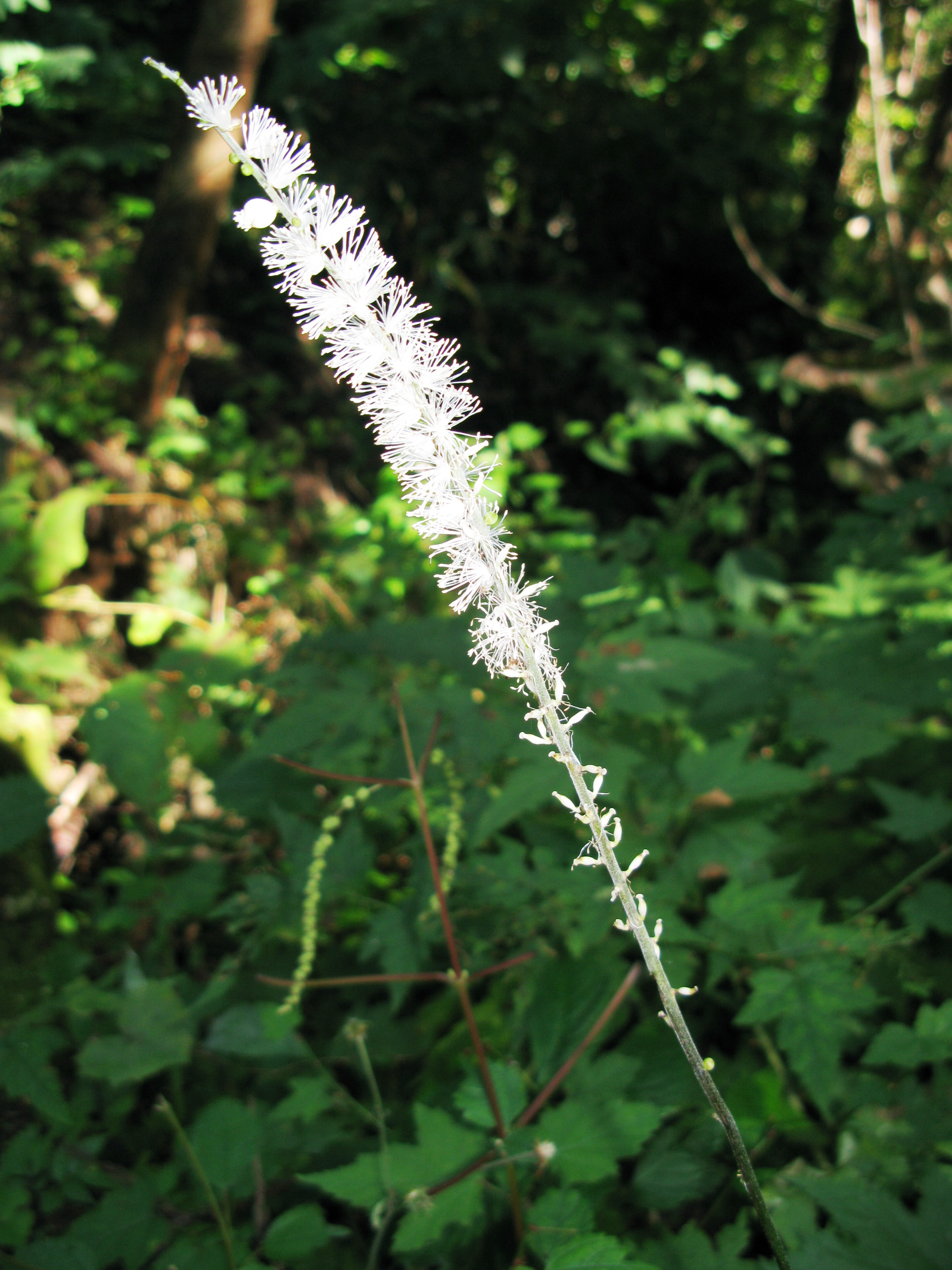
- Flower spike reaches 1 m (3 ft)
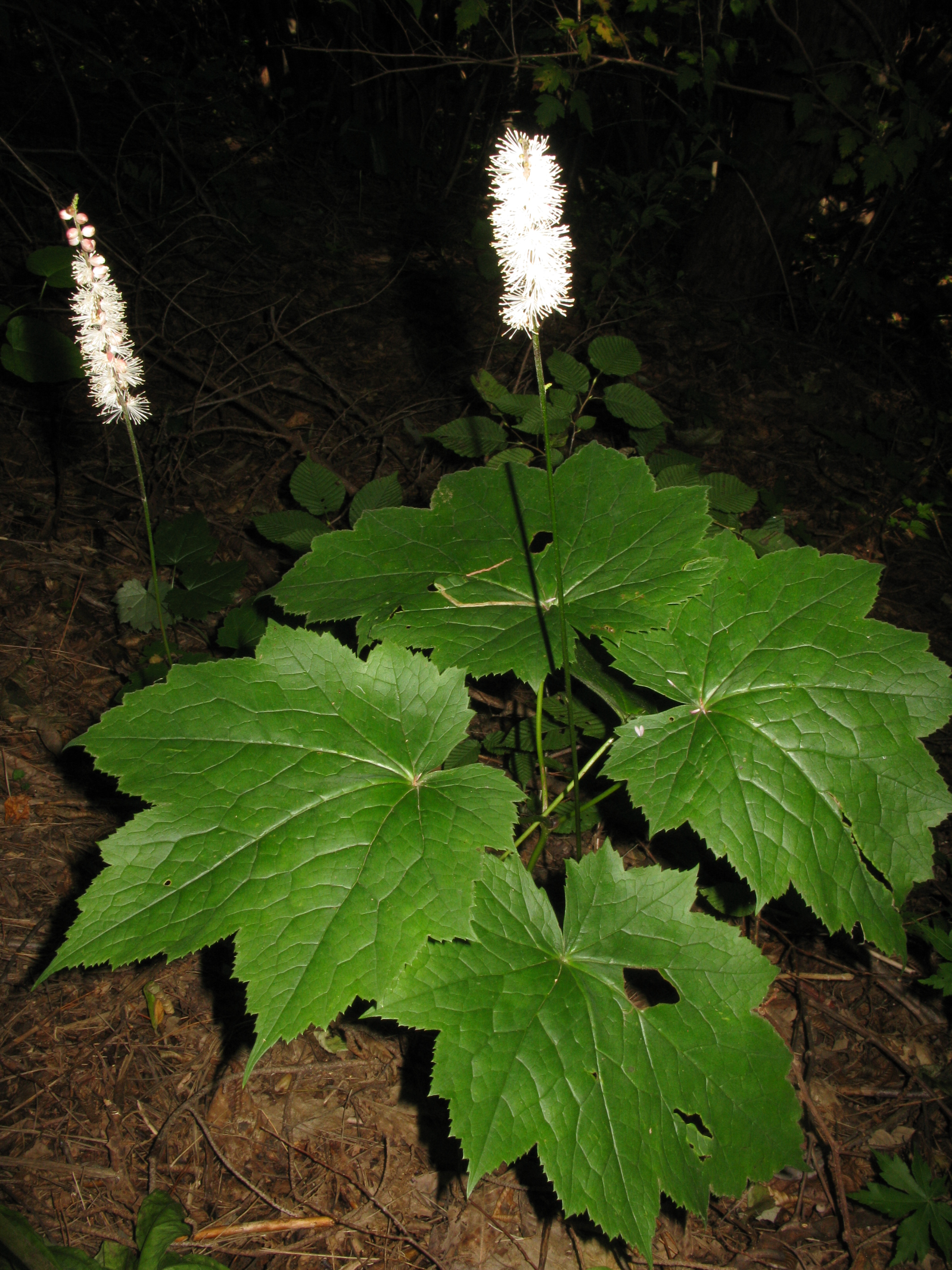
- Leaves can be 75 cm (30 in) wide

Scientific classification
- Kingdom: Plantae
- Clade: Tracheophytes
- Clade: Angiosperms
- Clade: Eudicots
- Order: Ranunculales
- Family: Ranunculaceae
- Genus: Actaea
- Species: A. japonica

Binomial name
- Actaea japonica Thunb.

Synonyms
- List: Actaea acerina Prantl; Cimicifuga acerina Tanaka; Cimicifuga acerina f. hispidula P.K.Hsiao; Cimicifuga acerina var. intermedia H.Hara; Cimicifuga acerina var. macrophylla (Koidz.) H.Hara; Cimicifuga acerina var. peltata (Makino) H.Hara; Cimicifuga chinensis Koidz.; Cimicifuga japonica (Thunb.) Spreng.; Cimicifuga japonica var. acerina Huth; Cimicifuga japonica var. macrophylla (Koidz.) H.Hara; Cimicifuga japonica f. peltata Makino; Cimicifuga japonica var. peltata (Makino) H.Hara; Cimicifuga macrophylla Koidz.; Cimicifuga peltata (Makino) Koidz.; Pityrosperma acerinum Siebold & Zucc.; Thalictrodes japonica (Thunb.) Kuntze

= Actaea japonica =

Species of plant

Actaea japonica, the Japanese bugbane, is a species of flowering plant in the family Ranunculaceae. It is native to central and southern China including Hainan, Jeju Island in South Korea, and central and southern Japan. A perennial, the Royal Horticultural Society considers it to be a good plant to attract pollinators.

== Cultivars ==
It has a number of commercially available cultivars, including 'Cheju‑Do' and 'Silver Dance'.
