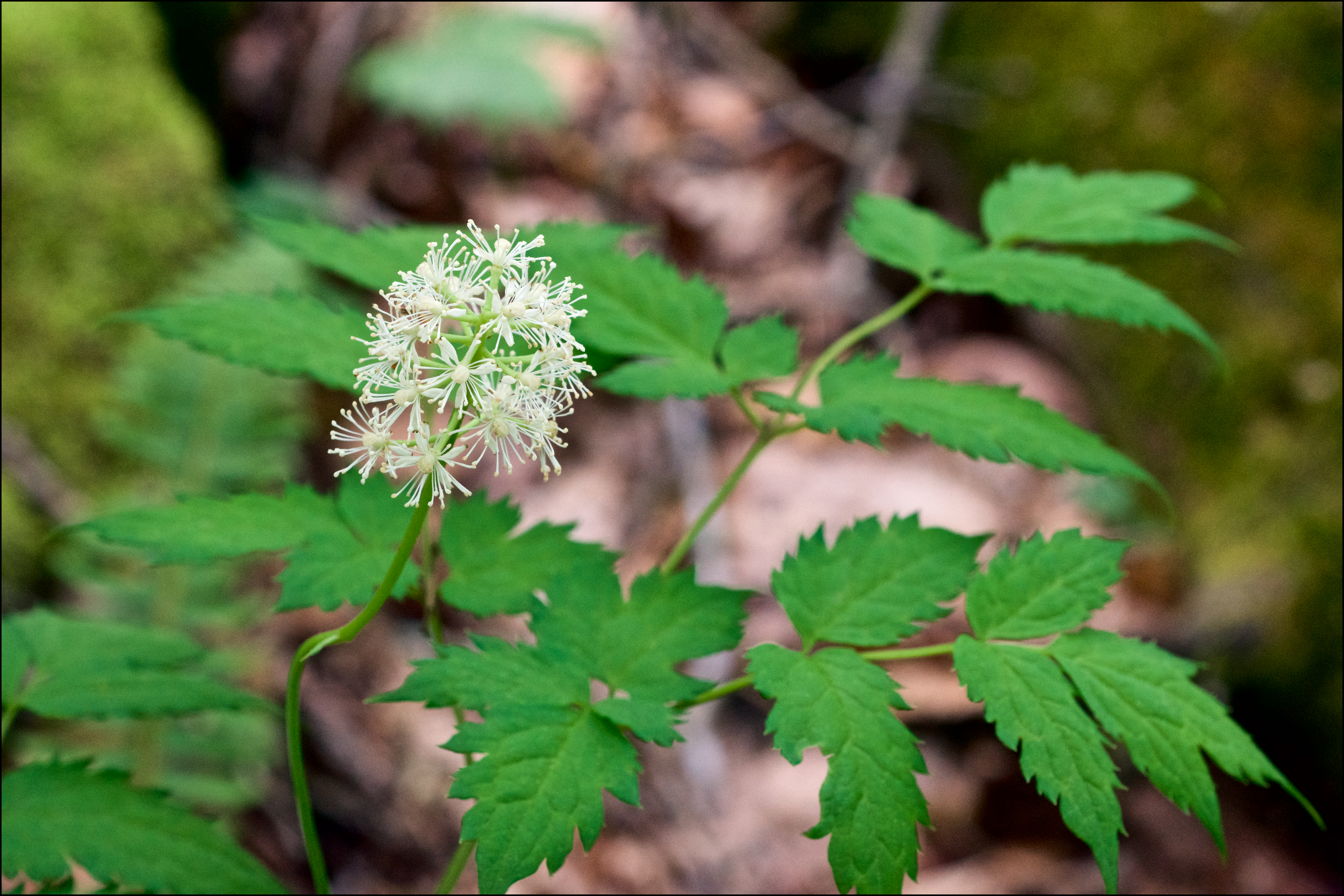
- Flowers and leaves

Conservation status
- Secure (NatureServe)

Scientific classification
- Kingdom: Plantae
- Clade: Tracheophytes
- Clade: Angiosperms
- Clade: Eudicots
- Order: Ranunculales
- Family: Ranunculaceae
- Genus: Actaea
- Species: A. pachypoda

Binomial name
- Actaea pachypoda Elliott

= Actaea pachypoda =

Species of plant

Actaea pachypoda, the white baneberry or doll's-eyes, is a species of flowering plant in the genus Actaea, of the family Ranunculaceae.

The plant is native to eastern North America, in eastern Canada, and the Midwestern and Eastern United States. It requires organically rich, humusy soil with excellent drainage, and is found in hardwood and mixed forest stands.

== Description ==
This herbaceous perennial plant grows to 46–76 cm (18–30 in) or more tall. It has toothed, bipinnate compound leaves up to 40 cm (16 in) long and 30 cm (12 in) broad.

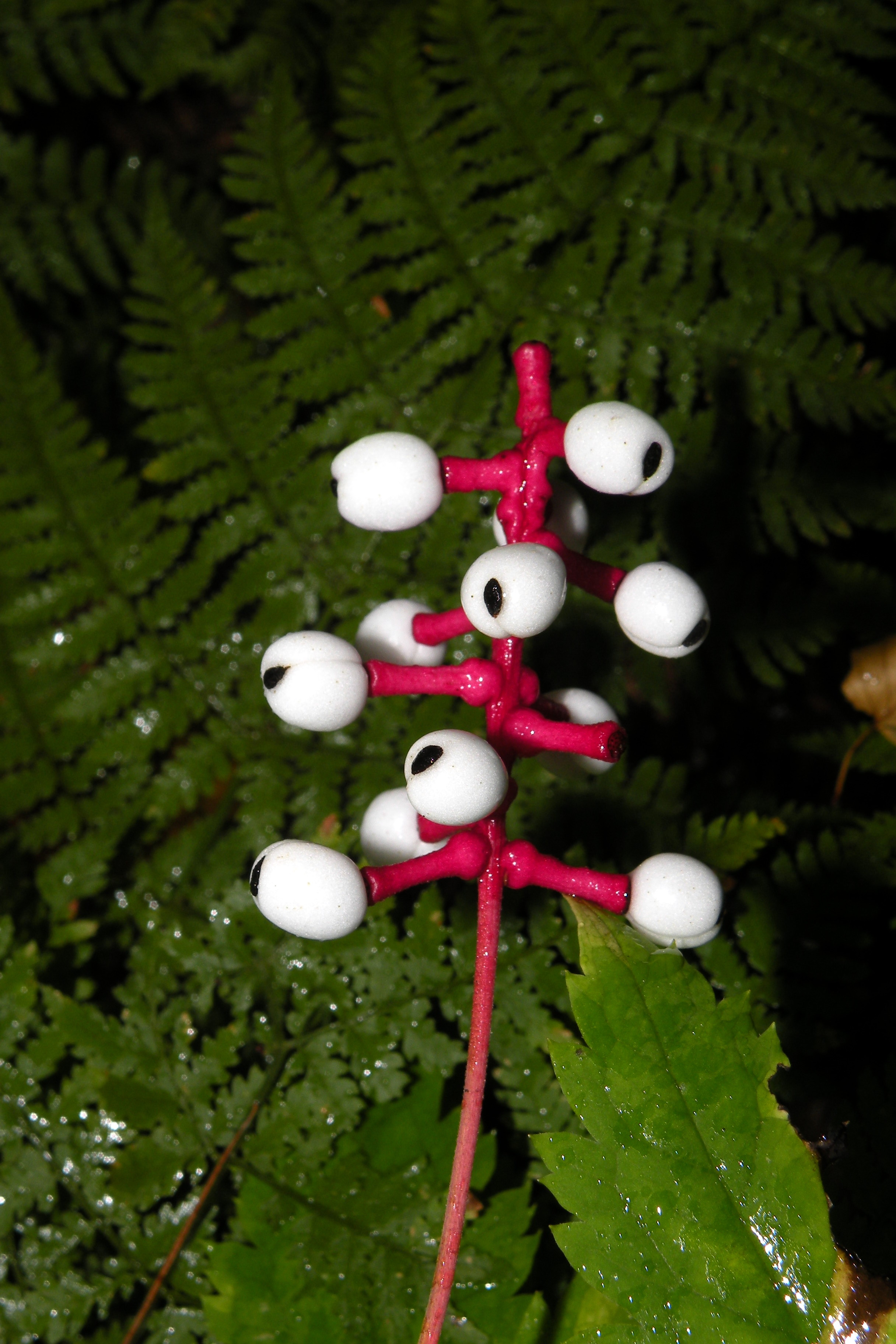
Actaea pachypoda fruit in Putnam, Connecticut

The white flowers are produced in spring in a dense raceme about 10 cm (3.9 in) long. The plant's most striking feature is its fruit, a 1 cm (1/2 in) diameter white berry, whose size, shape, and black stigma scar give the species its other common name, "doll's eyes". The pedicels thicken and become bright red as the berries develop.

The berries ripen over the summer, turning into fruits that persist on the plant until frost.

There are pink- and red-berried plants that have been called A. pachypoda forma rubrocarpa, but some of them produce infertile seed, and may actually be hybrids with Actaea rubra.

The specific name pachypoda means "thick foot", from Ancient Greek παχύς pakhús "thick" and πούς poús "foot", which could refer to the large rhizome of the plant or to the stalks supporting the berries, which are thicker than the closely related Actaea rubra.

=== Toxins ===
Both the berries and the entire plant are considered poisonous to humans. The berries contain cardiac toxins which can have an immediate sedative effect on human cardiac muscle tissue, and are the most poisonous part of the plant. Ingestion of the berries can lead to cardiac arrest and death.

== Ecology ==
A variety of birds, which are not affected by the toxins, eat the berries and help disperse the seeds. Long-tongued bees collect pollen from the flowers.

== Cultivation ==
Actaea pachypoda is cultivated as an ornamental plant, in traditional and wildlife gardens.

It requires part or full shade, rich loamy soil, and regular water with good drainage to reproduce in its native habitat.

== See also ==
- List of poisonous plants
