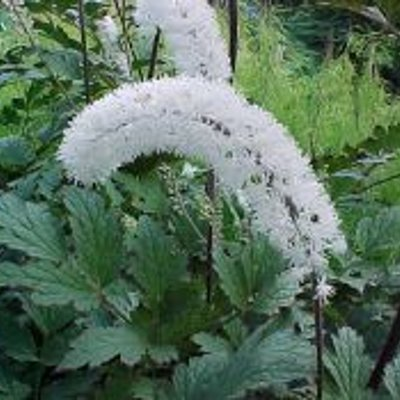
- Actaea matsumurae 'White Pearl'

Scientific classification
- Kingdom: Plantae
- Clade: Tracheophytes
- Clade: Angiosperms
- Clade: Eudicots
- Order: Ranunculales
- Family: Ranunculaceae
- Genus: Actaea
- Species: A. matsumurae

Binomial name
- Actaea matsumurae (Nakai) J. Compton & Hedd.

Synonyms
- Cimicifuga foetida var. matsumurae Nakai; Cimicifuga matsumurae (Nakai) Luferov; Cimicifuga matsumurae var. leiogyna (H.Takeda) Luferov

= Actaea matsumurae =

Species of flowering plant

Actaea matsumurae, the Kamchatka bugbane or Japanese bugbane, is a species of flowering plant in the buttercup family Ranunculaceae, that is native to Japan, Mongolia and Eastern Russia. Other common names include baneberry, which is also applied to other Actaea species.

This rhizomatous herbaceous perennial was formerly known as Cimicifuga matsumurae, a name which is still found in the horticultural literature.

== Description ==
The leaves are compound and deeply-cut in shape, with showy, miniature white flowers borne on erect stems in late summer or autumn. It is the latest flowering of the cultivated Actaea species. The racemes of flowers may bend towards the light. They may be followed by poisonous black berries.

== Cultivation ==
The plant is best grown in a partly-shaded, sheltered spot, in soil that remains reliably moist.

Two cultivars, 'Elstead Variety' and 'White Pearl' have achieved the Royal Horticultural Society's Award of Garden Merit. Growing 3–4 ft (0.91–1.22 m) tall, 'White Pearl' is the taller of the two cultivars.
