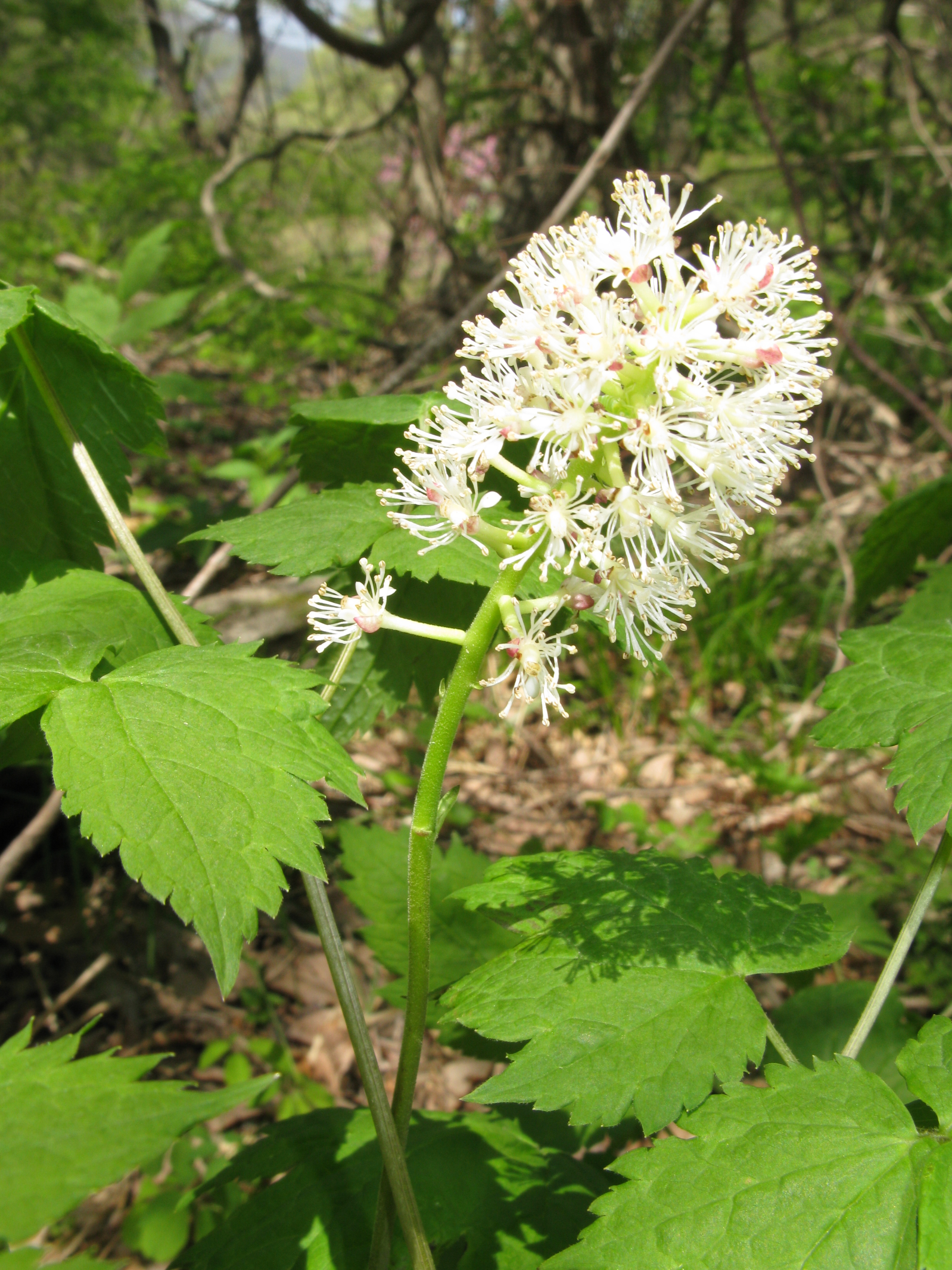
- Aizu area, Fukushima pref., Japan

Scientific classification
- Kingdom: Plantae
- Clade: Tracheophytes
- Clade: Angiosperms
- Clade: Eudicots
- Order: Ranunculales
- Family: Ranunculaceae
- Genus: Actaea
- Species: A. asiatica

Binomial name
- Actaea asiatica H.Hara

= Actaea asiatica =

Species of plant

Actaea asiatica, commonly known as Asian baneberry, is a species of baneberry that ranges throughout Asia. The flowers are ranges from gray to white. The berries are black-purple. The plant is extremely poisonous to humans. The fruits are eaten by birds which disperse the seeds.
