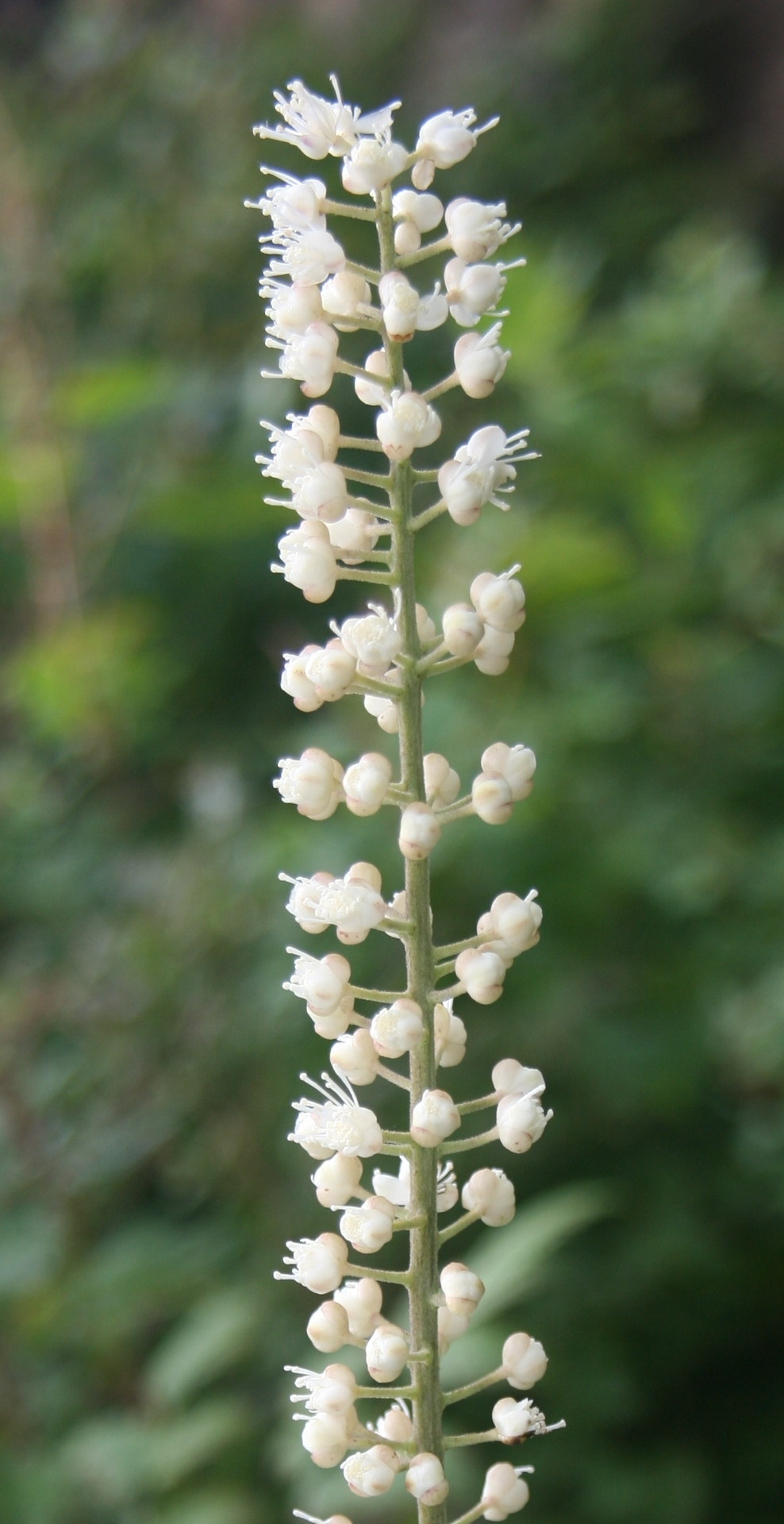
- Aizu area, Fukushima pref., Japan

Scientific classification
- Kingdom: Plantae
- Clade: Tracheophytes
- Clade: Angiosperms
- Clade: Eudicots
- Order: Ranunculales
- Family: Ranunculaceae
- Genus: Actaea
- Species: A. simplex

Binomial name
- Actaea simplex Wormsk. ex. Prantl

Synonyms
- Cimicifuga ramosa (Maxim. ex Franch. & Sav.) Nakai; Cimicifuga simplex (DC.) Wormsk. ex Turcz.; Cimicifuga taquetii H. Lev.; Thalictrodes simplex (DC.) Kuntze

= Actaea simplex =

Species of plant

Actaea simplex, the baneberry or bugbane, is a flowering plant in the buttercup family Ranunculaceae. A clump-forming rhizomatous herbaceous perennial, its native range includes the Kamchatka, Sakhalin and Siberian regions of Russia, western China, Manchuria, Mongolia, Korea and Japan. Plants may be harmful if eaten, and the sap may irritate the skin. The genus name Actaea is the Latin name adopted by Linnaeus from Pliny. The specific epithet simplex means simple or unbranched. The common name "bugbane" refers to the fact that the leaves' scent repels insects.

== Description ==
Growing to 1.2 metres (3.9 ft) tall by 0.6 metres (2.0 ft) wide, it has trifoliate and pinnate basal leaves. In summer it produces erect or arching stems with short terminal racemes of fragrant white blooms. It grows best in medium-moisture soils and part shade to full shade. In the US, it is suitable for hardiness zones 4 to 8. It is important not to let the plants dry out in hot, sunny situations.

== Cultivation ==
In cultivation in the UK, plants are still referenced and sold under their former name Cimicifuga simplex.

They are popular garden plants, valued for summer colour. The Atropurpurea Group have deep purple or black stems with pink-tinged flowers. The following have gained the Royal Horticultural Society's Award of Garden Merit:-

- 'Brunette', compact form
- 'Hillside Black Beauty', pale pink flowers
- 'James Compton'
