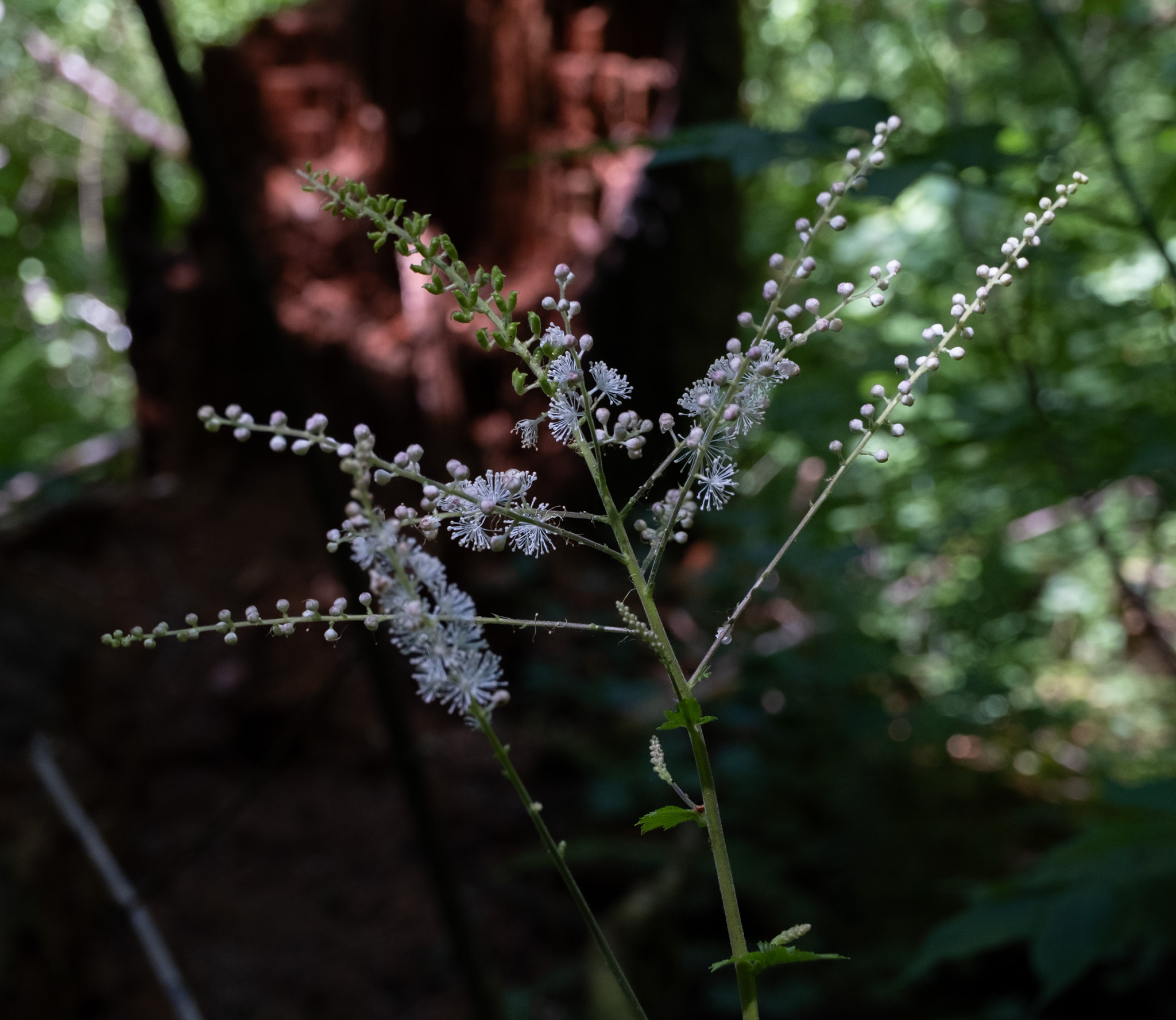

Conservation status
- Vulnerable (NatureServe)

Scientific classification
- Kingdom: Plantae
- Clade: Tracheophytes
- Clade: Angiosperms
- Clade: Eudicots
- Order: Ranunculales
- Family: Ranunculaceae
- Genus: Actaea
- Species: A. elata

Binomial name
- Actaea elata (Nutt.) Prantl

Synonyms
- Cimicifuga elata

= Actaea elata =

Species of flowering plant

Actaea elata (syn. Cimicifuga elata) is a species of flowering plant in the buttercup family known by the common name tall bugbane. It is native to the Pacific Northwest of North America, where it can be found in British Columbia, Washington, and Oregon.

== Description ==
This species is a rhizomatous herbaceous perennial reaching a maximum height around 1.8 meters. It is hairy in texture, with some glandular hairs. The leaves are made up of many lobed, toothed leaflets which resemble maple leaves in shape. The inflorescence is a branching panicle up to 17 centimeters long. The panicle bears many flowers, each with five white or pink-tinged sepals, but no petals. The flower presents a spray of long white stamens. Blooming occurs from May or June to August. The fruit is a flattened follicle up to 1.2 centimeters long. The fruits are poisonous. The plant has an unpleasant scent.

== Habitat ==
This species grows in moist woods and forest habitat. It is mostly restricted to lower elevations and is more common on north-facing slopes. It is associated with the forest trees Douglas fir (Pseudotsuga menziesii), bigleaf maple (Acer macrophyllum), western redcedar (Thuja plicata), red alder (Alnus rubra), and vine maple (Acer circinatum), and other forest plants such as oceanspray (Holodiscus discolor), hazelnut (Corylus cornuta), sword fern (Polystichum munitum), and snowberry (Symphoricarpos albus). Alpine enchanter's nightshade (Circaea alpina), herb robert (Geranium robertianum), and wall lettuce (Lactuca muralis) are indicator species for the plant, often growing alongside it. This species can dominate the forest understory where it is common. The plant may be found in old-growth forests. It prefers the shade of dense forests. It can tolerate some breaks in the canopy but not large-scale clearing, such as clearcutting. Some penetrating sunlight is beneficial for the plant during its reproductive season. Animals associated with the species include the mountain beaver (Aplodontia rufa), particularly in Canada. Depending on location, pollinators of the plant include bumblebees, other types of bees, beetles, and syrphid flies.

== Distribution ==
This species has a limited distribution in its range. Most occurrences are in southern Oregon, where the populations can be large. There are fewer occurrences in Washington. In British Columbia, the plant is only known from the far southern regions of the province, near the Chilliwack River. It is considered an endangered species in British Columbia. There are ten known populations in British Columbia, making up less than 5% of the global population of the plant.

In 2004 a new variety of the species was named and defined, var. alpestris. This variety is endemic to southern Oregon and it differs from other members of its species by having scales along the lower stem, and often more pistils. It may also be found at higher elevations.

Threats to this species include processes that threaten its home ecosystems, such as the old-growth forests of the Pacific Northwest. Fire suppression, logging, road maintenance, and other forest disturbance, collection from the wild, and damage to pollinator populations can harm occurrences of the plant.
