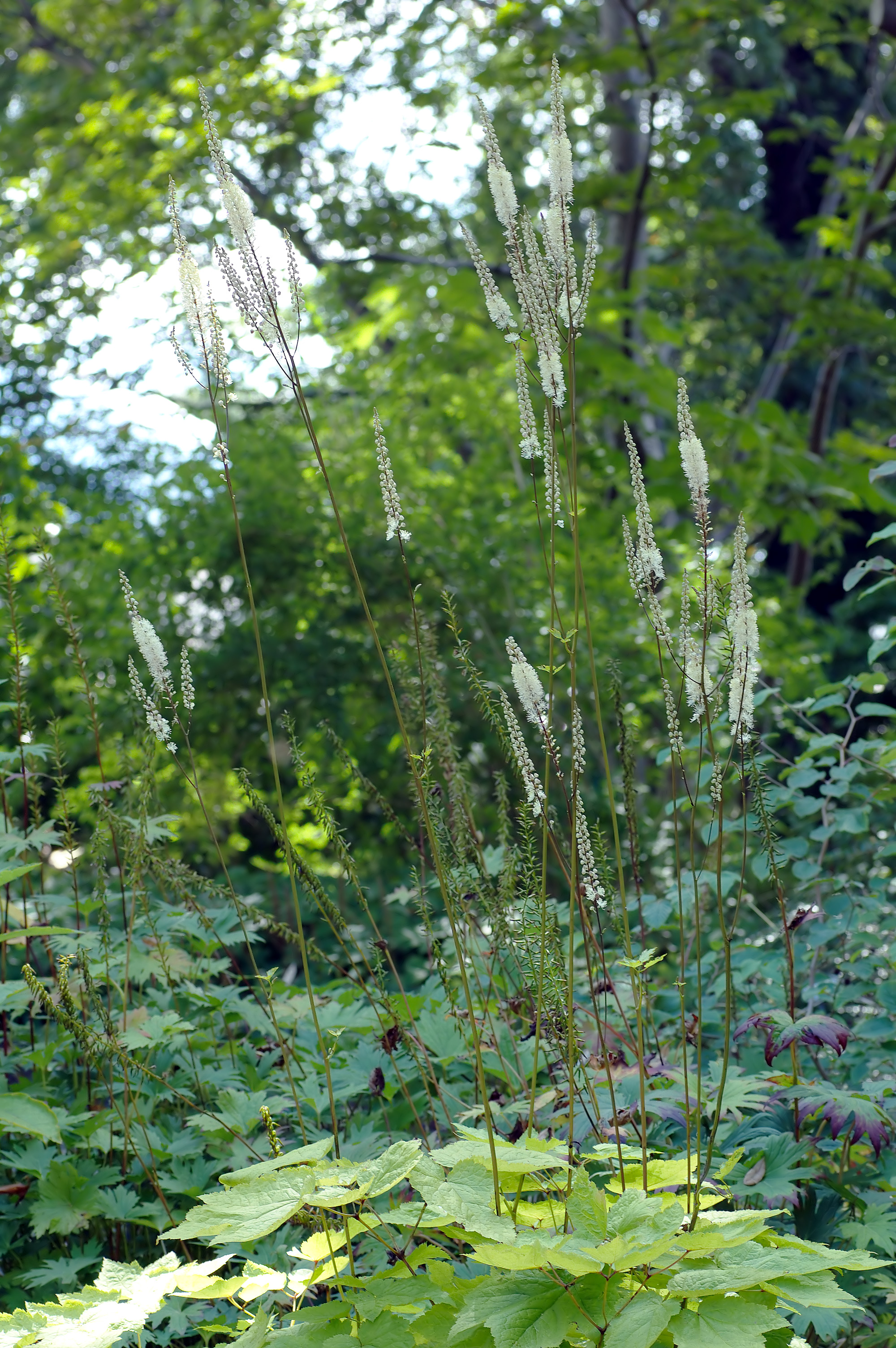

Scientific classification
- Kingdom: Plantae
- Clade: Tracheophytes
- Clade: Angiosperms
- Clade: Eudicots
- Order: Ranunculales
- Family: Ranunculaceae
- Genus: Actaea
- Species: A. heracleifolia

Binomial name
- Actaea heracleifolia (Kom.) J.Compton

= Actaea heracleifolia =

Plant species

Actaea heracleifolia is a species of plant in the family Ranunculaceae, native to Asia where it is found from the Russian Far East to Korea and Central China.

It was first described in 1900 as Cimicifuga heracleifolia by Vladimir Leontyevich Komarov In 1998, it was transferred to the genus, Actaea by British botanist, James A. Compton and others. This change has not been accepted by all botanical authorities.

== Description ==
It is a perennial herb growing up to 1.2 m tall on mountain slopes and in forests. The white flowers bloom in August and September, in compound racemes at the ends of the stems. The root is thick and reddish black.

== Distribution ==
It is found in Russia, northeastern China and Korea. In South Korea ii is found in Gyeonggi-do.

== Uses ==
In South Korea, its roots are used for medicinal purposes.
