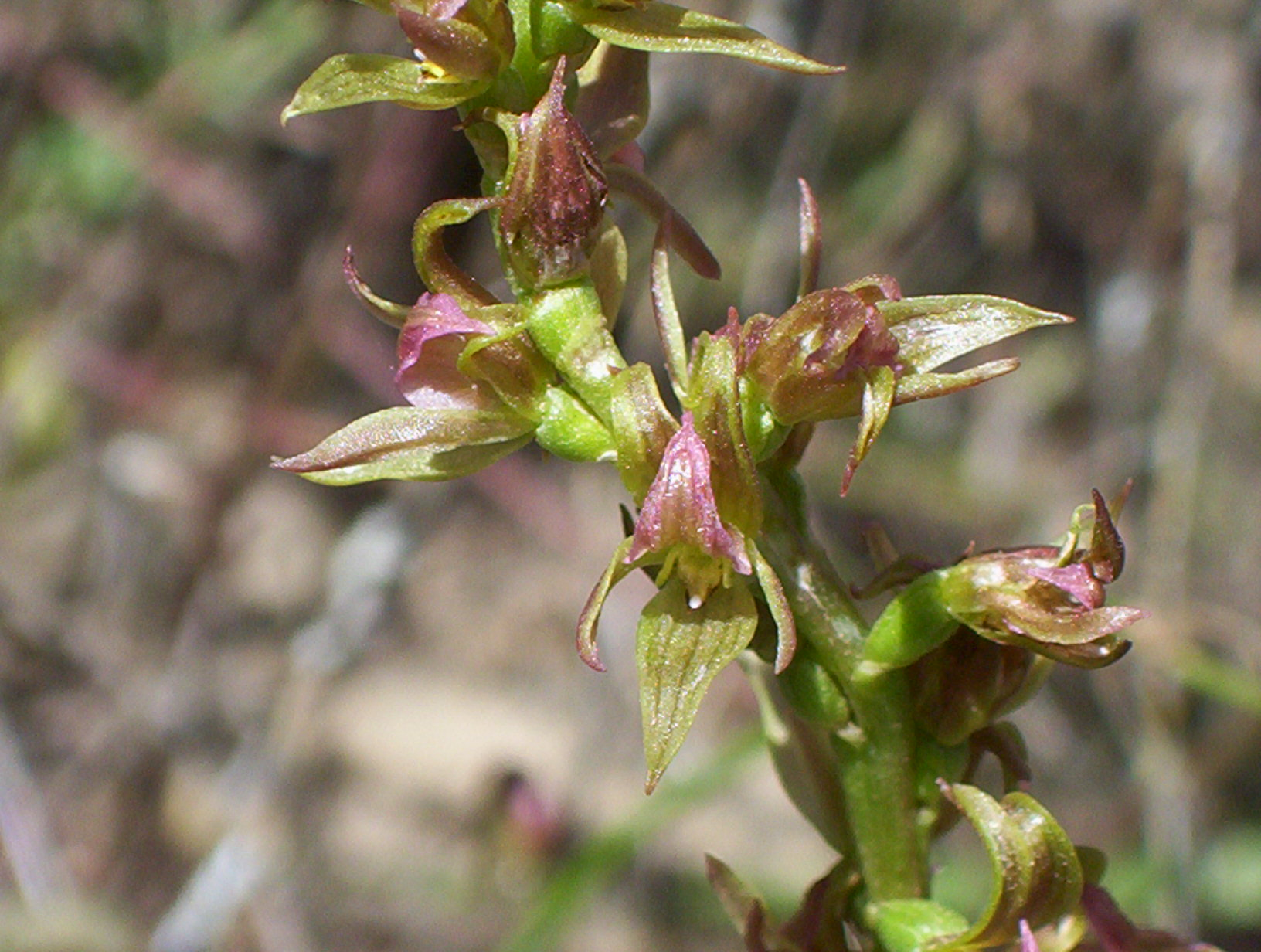

Scientific classification
- Kingdom: Plantae
- Clade: Embryophytes
- Clade: Tracheophytes
- Clade: Spermatophytes
- Clade: Angiosperms
- Clade: Monocots
- Order: Asparagales
- Family: Orchidaceae
- Subfamily: Orchidoideae
- Tribe: Diurideae
- Subtribe: Prasophyllinae
- Genus: Prasophyllum
- Species: P. maccannii

Binomial name
- Prasophyllum maccannii D.L.Jones & D.T.Rouse

= Prasophyllum maccannii =

Inland leek orchid

Species of orchid

Prasophyllum maccannii, commonly known as inland leek orchid, is a species of orchid endemic to Victoria. It has a single tubular green leaf and up to forty green, greenish-pink or brownish flowers. It is found in the central-west of the state, growing in open forest.

== Description ==
Prasophyllum maccannii is a terrestrial, perennial, deciduous, herb with an underground tuber and a single tube-shaped leaf up to 100–200 mm (4–8 in) long and 3–5 mm (0.1–0.2 in) wide at the base, but which is withered by flowering time. Between fifteen and forty scented flowers are crowded along a flowering stem 80–200 mm (3–8 in) long, reaching to 150–600 mm (6–20 in) tall. The flowers are green, greenish-pink or brownish and as with others in the genus, are inverted so that the labellum is above the column rather than below it. The dorsal sepal is egg-shaped to lance-shaped, 9–13 mm (0.4–0.5 in) long. The lateral sepals are a similar size, linear to lance-shaped and joined to each other, although sometimes only in the lower half. The petals are linear to lance-shaped and 7–11 mm (0.3–0.4 in) long. The labellum is white, pink or brownish 7–11 mm (0.3–0.4 in) long and turns upwards through 90° near its middle. The edges of the erect part of the labellum are sometimes slightly wavy and there is a raised, greenish, tapering callus in the centre of the labellum and extending almost to its tip. Flowering occurs in November and December.

== Taxonomy and naming ==
Prasophyllum maccannii was first formally described in 2006 by David Jones and Dean Rouse. The description was published in Australian Orchid Research from a specimen collected from near Ponomal. The specific epithet (maccannii) honours the Victorian naturalist Ian Robert McCann (1914-2003).

== Distribution and habitat ==
Inland leek orchid grows in open forest in the central west of Victoria.

== Conservation ==
Prasophyllum maccannii is listed as Endangered under the Victorian Flora and Fauna Guarantee Act 1988.
