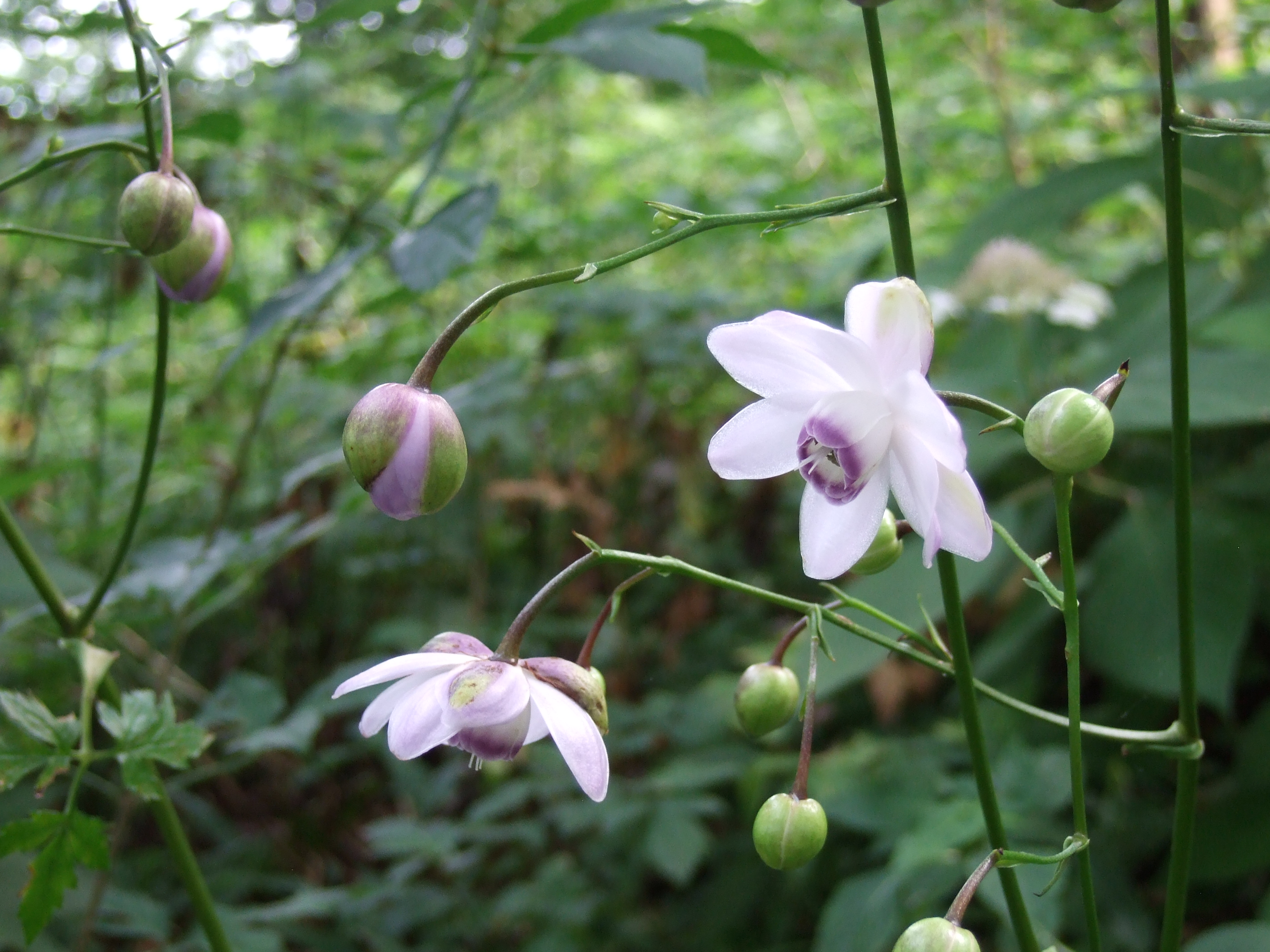

Scientific classification
- Kingdom: Plantae
- Clade: Tracheophytes
- Clade: Angiosperms
- Clade: Eudicots
- Order: Ranunculales
- Family: Ranunculaceae
- Subfamily: Ranunculoideae
- Tribe: Cimicifugeae
- Genus: Anemonopsis; Siebold & Zucc.
- Species: A. macrophylla

Binomial name
- Anemonopsis macrophylla Siebold & Zucc.

= Anemonopsis =

Genus of flowering plants

Anemonopsis, the false anemone, is a monotypic genus in the family Ranunculaceae, containing only the species Anemonopsis macrophylla, endemic to Japan's main island of Honshu. The generic name Anemonopsis refers to it being Anemone-like (-opsis), and its specific epithet macrophylla means "large-leaved".

== Description ==
Anemonopsis is a herbaceous perennial growing approximately 75 cm high, with pale lavender flowers in late summer, each about 2 cm in diameter. The flowers are bowl-shaped with a rosette of petals in the center, and are downward facing. The flowers are held well above the foliage; although not a small plant, the overall impression is one of daintiness and airiness.

When in full bloom, the flowers resemble small lotuses, giving rise to its Japanese name of renge-shōma (蓮華升麻; lit. "lotus-shōma"). The genus Kirengeshoma in turn is named after it.

Native to Japan's colder temperate areas (southern Tōhoku to Kinki), Anemonopsis is frost-hardy at least to zone 4. It is a true woodland plant and cannot tolerate full sun without the leaves scorching, except perhaps in very cool, damp climates. It must also be protected from drying winds.

== Cultivation ==
Like many other herbaceous perennials from Japan, Anemonopsis demands summer moisture, but resents excessively wet conditions in winter. It is thus much more easily grown in continental climate of the eastern United States and Canada than in the Mediterranean climate of the Pacific Northwest.

== Propagation ==
Anemonopsis is self-fertile, and an isolated plant will set modest amounts of seed. If sown in containers as soon as ripe and the seed containers exposed to winter chilling, germination will occur the next spring. Unlike some members of the Ranunculaceae, which are notorious for their seeds remaining viable only for a very short time, Anemonopsis seed retains its viability in storage to a reasonable degree. However, fresh seed is preferable to stored seed.

As with many other members of the Ranunculaceae, seedlings of Anemonopsis form only cotyledons in their first season; the first true leaves form the year after germination. Seedlings are slow to reach maturity, and flower in about 5 years. They may be more easily handled by growing in pots until they reach a size suitable for planting out.

No particular treatment of seed is necessary other than exposure to ordinary winter chilling.

Anemonopsis can also be propagated by division.
