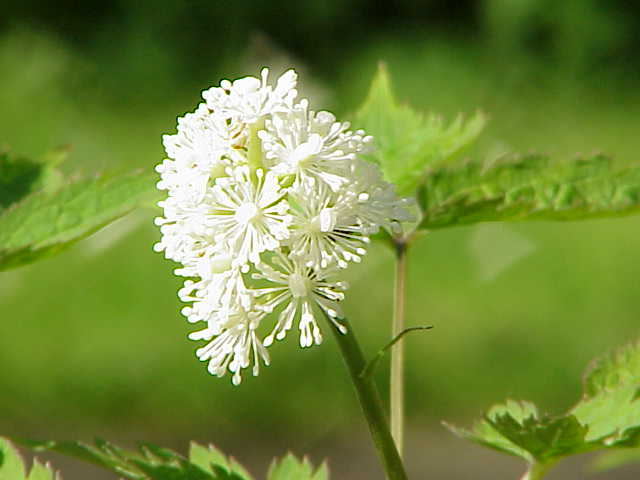
- Actaea rubra

Scientific classification
- Kingdom: Plantae
- Clade: Tracheophytes
- Clade: Angiosperms
- Clade: Eudicots
- Order: Ranunculales
- Family: Ranunculaceae
- Subfamily: Ranunculoideae
- Tribe: Cimicifugeae
- Genus: Actaea; L.

Species
- See text

Synonyms
- Actinospora Turcz. ex Fisch. & C.A.Mey.; Actinospora Turcz.; Botrophis Raf.; Christophoriana Mill.; Cimicifuga Wernisch.; Dipleina Raf.; Macrotrys Raf.; Megotrys Raf.; Pityrosperma Siebold & Zucc.; Souliea Franch.; Thalictrodes Kuntze

= Actaea (plant) =

Genus of plants

Actaea, commonly called baneberry, bugbane and cohosh, is a genus of flowering plants of the family Ranunculaceae, native to subtropical, temperate and subarctic regions of Europe, Asia and North America.

== Taxonomy ==
The genus was redefined to include Cimicifuga and Souliea in the 1990s (Compton et al. 1998, Compton & Culham 2002, Gao et al. 2006, RHS Plant Finder, 2007) based on combined evidence from DNA sequence data, similarity in biochemical constituents and on morphology returning it to the original Linnean concept of the genus. The number of species in Actaea is 25–30 using this concept. Other botanists (e.g., Hoffman 1999, Wang et al. 1999, Lee & Park 2004, Wang et al. 2009) reject this merger because only one group (Actaea) have fleshy fruit while the remainder have dry fruit. However, this narrower generic concept works for only a single morphological character and other characters such as number of carpels moves the generic boundary. The genus is treated here in its broader sense.

=== Species ===
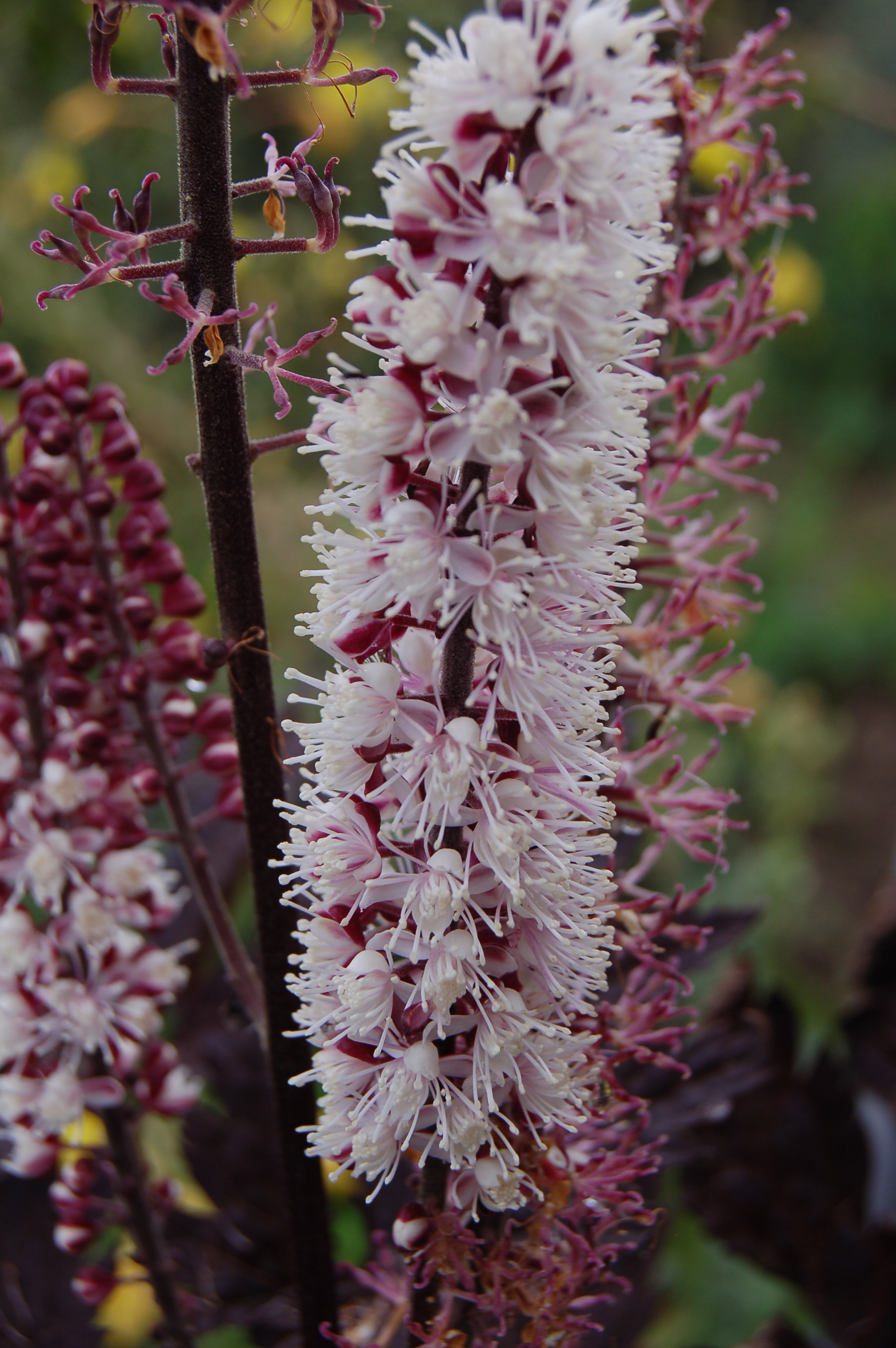
Cimicifuga Brunette or "Brunette bugbane" is a variety of A. simplex (U.K.)

Plants of the World Online currently (2023) includes:

1. Actaea arizonica (S.Watson) J.Compton – Arizona bugbane
2. Actaea asiatica H.Hara
3. Actaea austrokoreana (H.W.Lee & C.W.Park) Cubey
4. Actaea bifida (Nakai) J.Compton
5. Actaea biternata (Siebold & Zucc.) Prantl
6. Actaea brachycarpa (P.K.Hsiao) J.Compton
7. Actaea cimicifuga L.
8. Actaea cordifolia DC.
9. Actaea dahurica (Turcz. ex Fisch. & C.A.Mey.) Franch. (syn. Cimicifuga dahurica) - Sheng ma in Chinese (Chinese: 升麻; pinyin: Shēng má)
10. Actaea elata (Nutt.) Prantl
11. Actaea erythrocarpa (Fisch.) Kom.
12. Actaea europaea (Schipcz.) J.Compton
13. Actaea frigida (Royle) Prantl
14. Actaea heracleifolia (Kom.) J.Compton
15. Actaea japonica Thunb.
16. Actaea kashmiriana (J.Compton & Hedd.) J.Compton
17. Actaea laciniata (S.Watson) J.Compton
18. Actaea lancifoliolata (X.F.Pu & M.R.Jia) J.P.Luo, Q.Yuan & Q.E.Yang
19. Actaea × ludovicii B.Boivin
20. Actaea matsumurae (Nakai) J.Compton & Hedd. – Kamchatka bugbane, Japanese bugbane
21. Actaea muliensis J.P.Luo, Q.E.Yang & Q.Yuan
22. Actaea nanchuanensis (P.K.Hsiao) J.P.Luo, Q.Yuan & Q.E.Yang
23. Actaea pachypoda Elliott – white baneberry, white cohosh, doll's eyes
24. Actaea podocarpa DC.
25. Actaea purpurea (P.K.Hsiao) J.Compton
26. Actaea racemosa L. – black cohosh, black bugbane
27. Actaea rubifolia (Kearney) Kartesz
28. Actaea rubra (Aiton) Willd. (syn. Actaea erythrocarpa) – red baneberry
29. Actaea simplex (DC.) Wormsk. ex Prantl
30. Actaea spicata L. (syn. Actaea alba) – baneberry, herb christopher - type species
31. Actaea taiwanensis J.Compton, Hedd. & T.Y.Yang
32. Actaea vaginata (Maxim.) J.Compton
33. Actaea yunnanensis (P.K.Hsiao) J.Compton

=== Etymology ===
Actaea is derived from the Greek name for elder (Sambucus); it was named by Pliny because the leaves of Actaea and Sambucus are similar in appearance.

The name Actaea alba (L.) Mill. is a confused one (Fernald 1940); although described as an American species (now named A. pachypoda), the illustration on which the description was based was actually a picture of the European A. spicata, and strictly, the name is therefore a synonym of the European species. Some texts, however, still treat A. pachypoda under this name.

== Use and toxicity ==
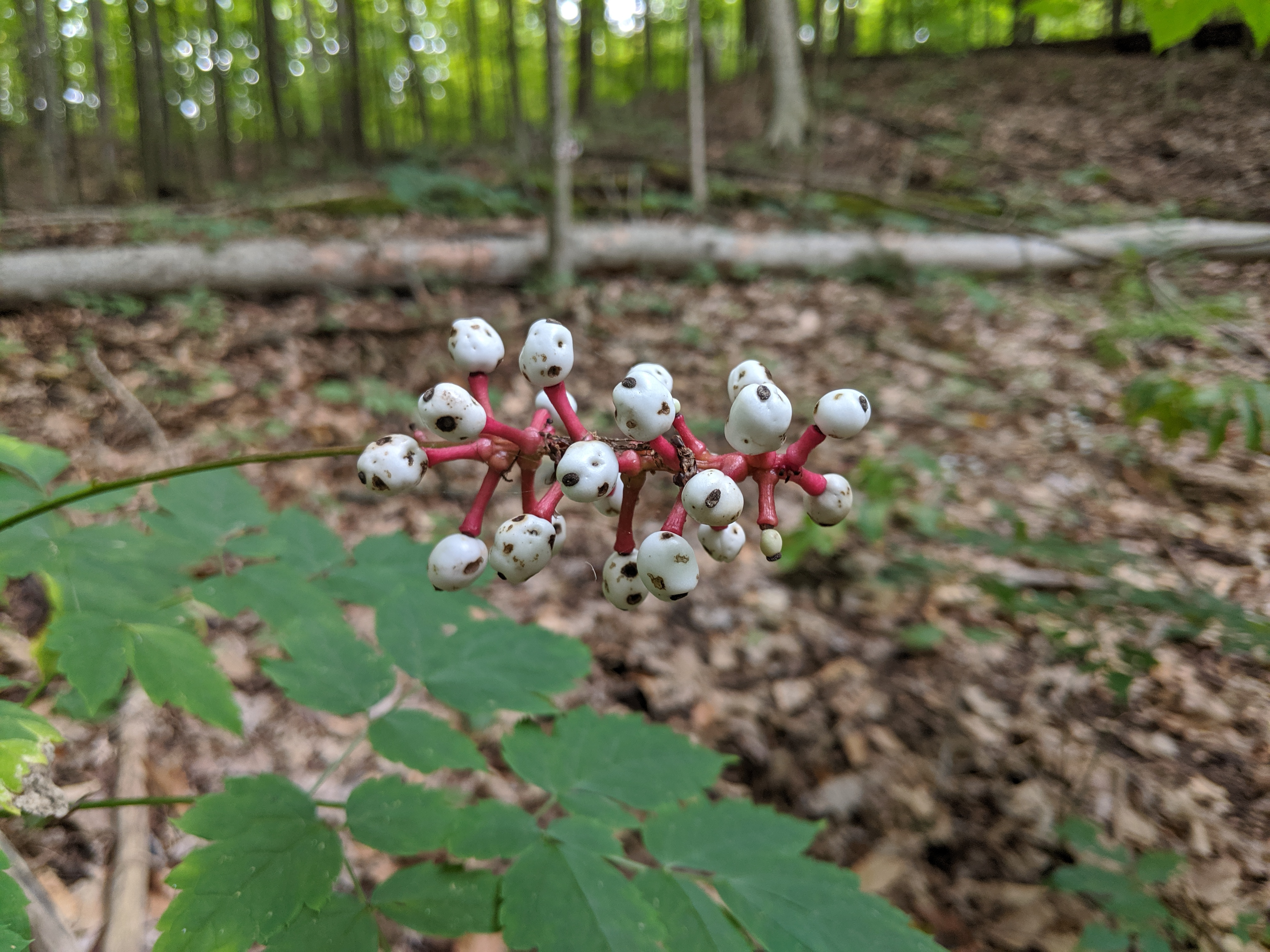
White baneberry (Actaea pachypoda) in Canada

Baneberry contains cardiac toxins that can have an immediate sedative effect on human cardiac muscle. The berries are the most poisonous part of the plant (hence the name baneberry), but all parts of the plant have some level of toxicity. Baneberries contain the glycoside ranunculin and other irritant compounds. The particular Actaea species Actaea pachypoda (white baneberry or "doll’s eyes") and Actaea rubra (red baneberry) are toxic to humans primarily due to protoanemonin. Protoanemonin is produced when plant tissue is damaged, such as by chewing, and it acts as a potent irritant to the mucous membranes. When ingested, it can cause symptoms such as a burning sensation in the mouth and throat, excessive salivation, nausea, vomiting, abdominal cramps, and diarrhea. In addition to protoanemonin, baneberry contains other compounds with cardiotoxic effects. These can interfere with heart function, leading to symptoms such as dizziness, heart palpitations, and in severe cases, cardiac arrest and death. Poisonings in adults are rare because the berries have an extremely bitter taste that typically discourages consumption. Human or livestock fatalities associated with baneberry have not been confirmed in the United States.

Children have been poisoned by eating the waxy, shiny red or white berries. It is also toxic to rabbits. The berries are harmless to birds, the plant's primary seed disperser.

The synonym Cimicifuga, meaning 'bed bug repellent', has traditional uses: for example, in pharmacology, Cimicifugae rhizoma is a herbal medicine Sheng ma, a Chinese preparation which may be extracted from the roots of A. dahurica and A. heracleifolia. The roots of A. rubra contain β-sitosterol glucoside.

Actaea species are in the same subfamily as plants in the genus Aconitum, a highly toxic plant genus which contains wolfbane and several varieties of monkshood.
