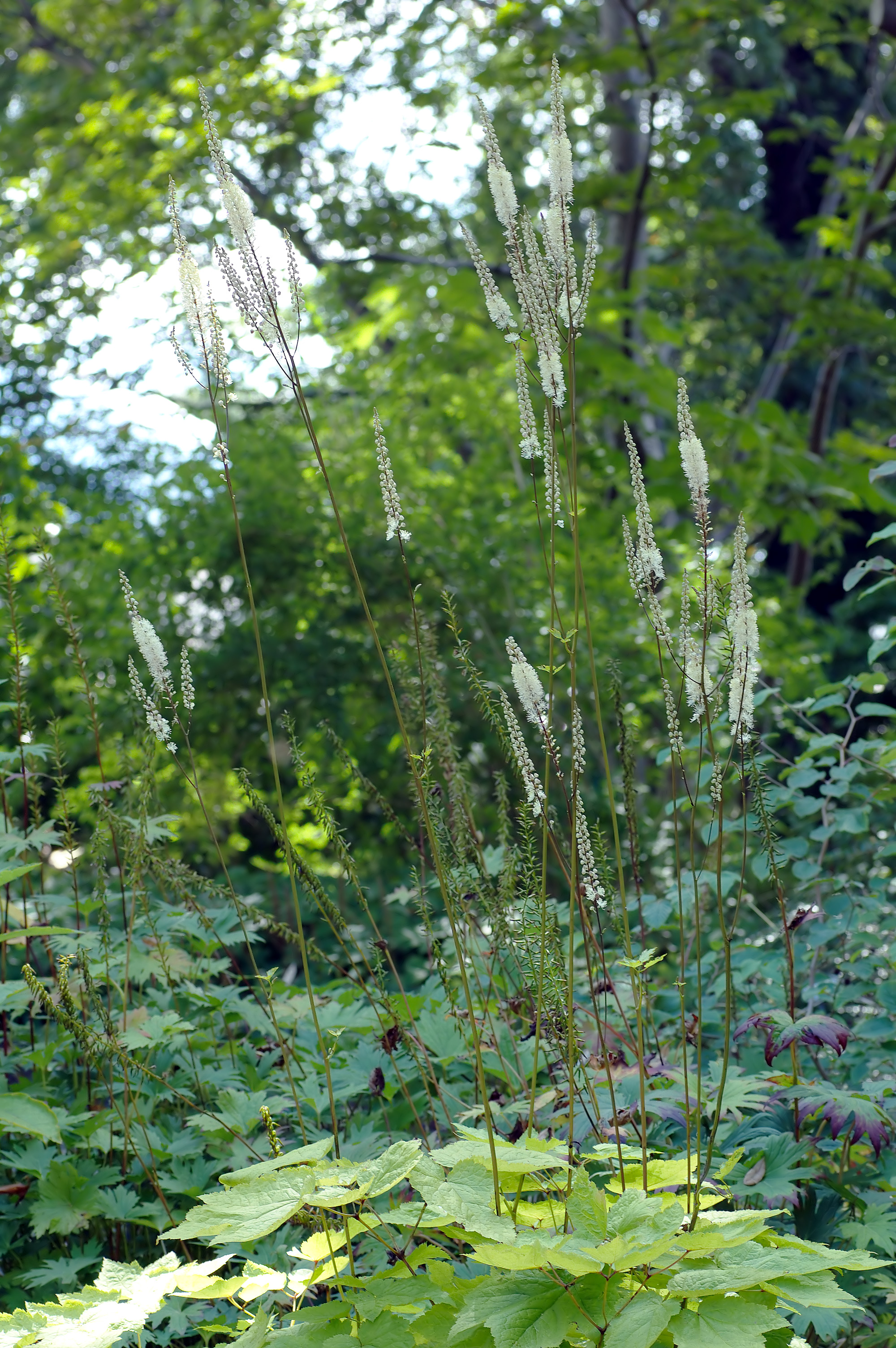
- Cimicifuga heracleifolia

Scientific classification
- Kingdom: Plantae
- Clade: Tracheophytes
- Clade: Angiosperms
- Clade: Eudicots
- Order: Ranunculales
- Family: Ranunculaceae
- Subfamily: Ranunculoideae
- Tribe: Cimicifugeae; Torr. & A.Gray

Type genus
- Cimicifuga Wernisch.

= Cimicifugeae =

Invalidated genus of flowering plants

The Cimicifugeae are a tribe of flowering plants belonging to the family Ranunculaceae, based on the now obsolete genus Cimicifuga (sometimes called "bugbane" or "cohosh"). The name Cimicifuga means "bed bug repeller".

In pharmacology, Cimicifugae rhizoma is a herbal medicine (Cimicifuga/Actea root), translated as Sheng ma, a Chinese root preparation.

== Genera ==
- Actaea L. - of which Cimicifuga is a synonym.
- Anemonopsis Siebold & Zucc. (monotypic)
- Beesia Balf.f. & W.W.Sm.
- Eranthis Salisb.
- †Paleoactaea Pigg & DeVore, 2005

=== Selected Cimicifuga species ===
- Cimicifuga arizonica
- Cimicifuga dahurica - Sheng ma in Chinese (Chinese: 升麻; pinyin: Sheng ma)
- Cimicifuga elata
- Cimicifuga europaea
- Cimicifuga heracleifolia - both used in TCM as Sheng ma in Chinese (Chinese: 升麻; pinyin: Sheng ma)
- Cimicifuga japonica
- Cimicifuga racemosa
- Cimicifuga simplex
