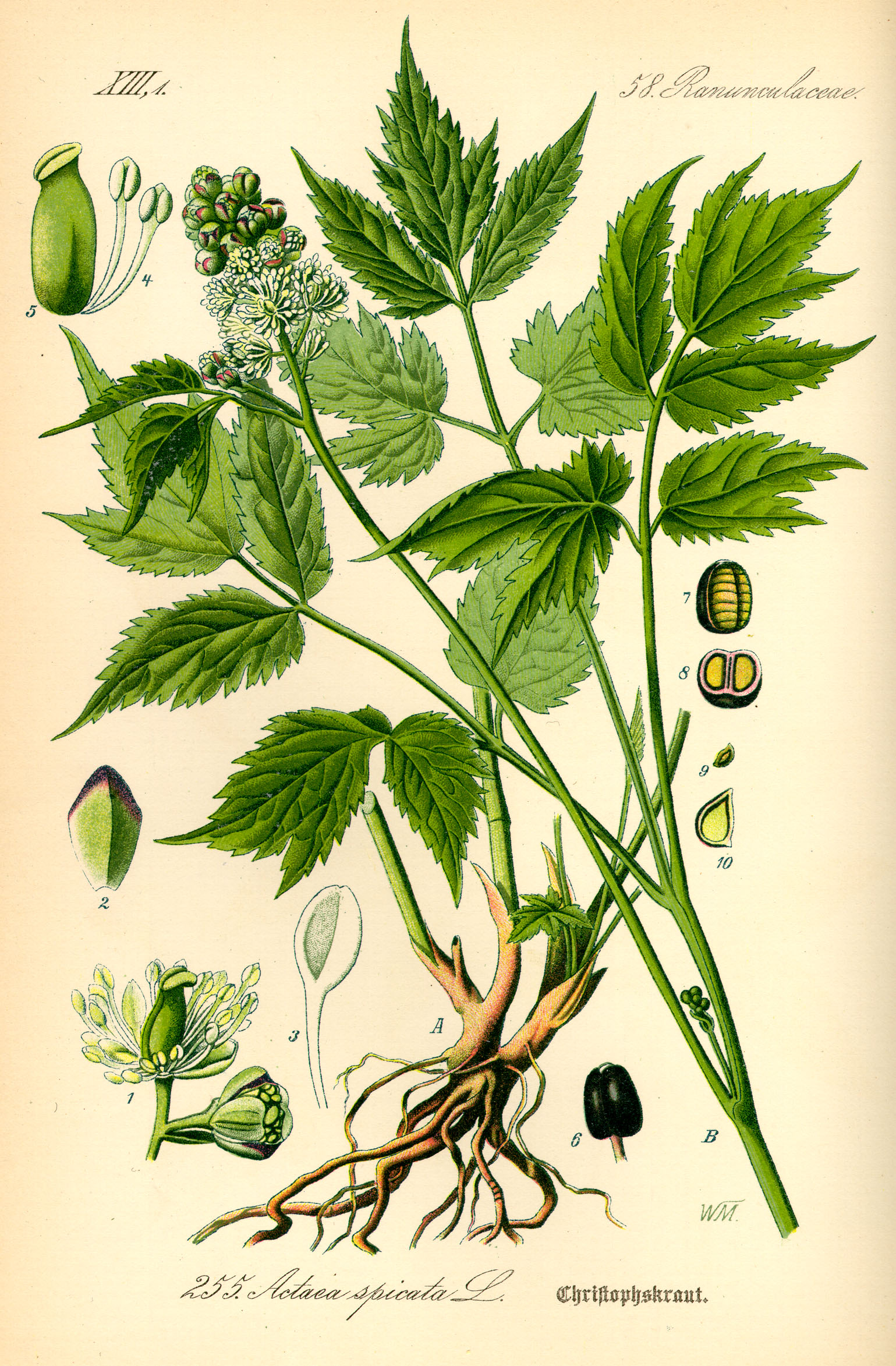
- 19th century illustration

Conservation status
- Least Concern (IUCN 3.1)

Scientific classification
- Kingdom: Plantae
- Clade: Tracheophytes
- Clade: Angiosperms
- Clade: Eudicots
- Order: Ranunculales
- Family: Ranunculaceae
- Genus: Actaea
- Species: A. spicata

Binomial name
- Actaea spicata L.

Synonyms
- Actaea christophoriana Gouan; Actaea corymbosa Stokes; Actaea densiflora M.Král; Actaea nigra (L.) P.Gaertn., B.Mey. & Schreb.; Christophoriana spicata L.Moench; Christophoriana vulgaris Rupr.

= Actaea spicata =

Species of plant

Actaea spicata, the baneberry or herb Christopher, is a species of flowering plant in the genus Actaea, native from Europe to western Siberia and northern Iran. It is often found on limestone edges and in deciduous woodland; key factors are shade, low competition, and a cool, protected root run.

== Description ==
Actaea spicata is a herbaceous perennial plant growing up to 65 cm (2 ft 2 in) tall. The basal leaves are large, biternate or bipinnate. The leaflets are more-or-less toothed. The flowers are white, with 3–6 petaloid sepals, and are produced in an erect raceme. The fruit is a berry, black when ripe and 10–13 mm (0.4–0.5 in) across. Its fruit persists for an average of 57.5 days, and bears an average of 11.4 seeds per fruit. Fruits average 90.7% water, and their dry weight includes 2.4% carbohydrates (possibly the lowest of any European fleshy fruit) and 1.0% lipids.

== Taxonomy ==
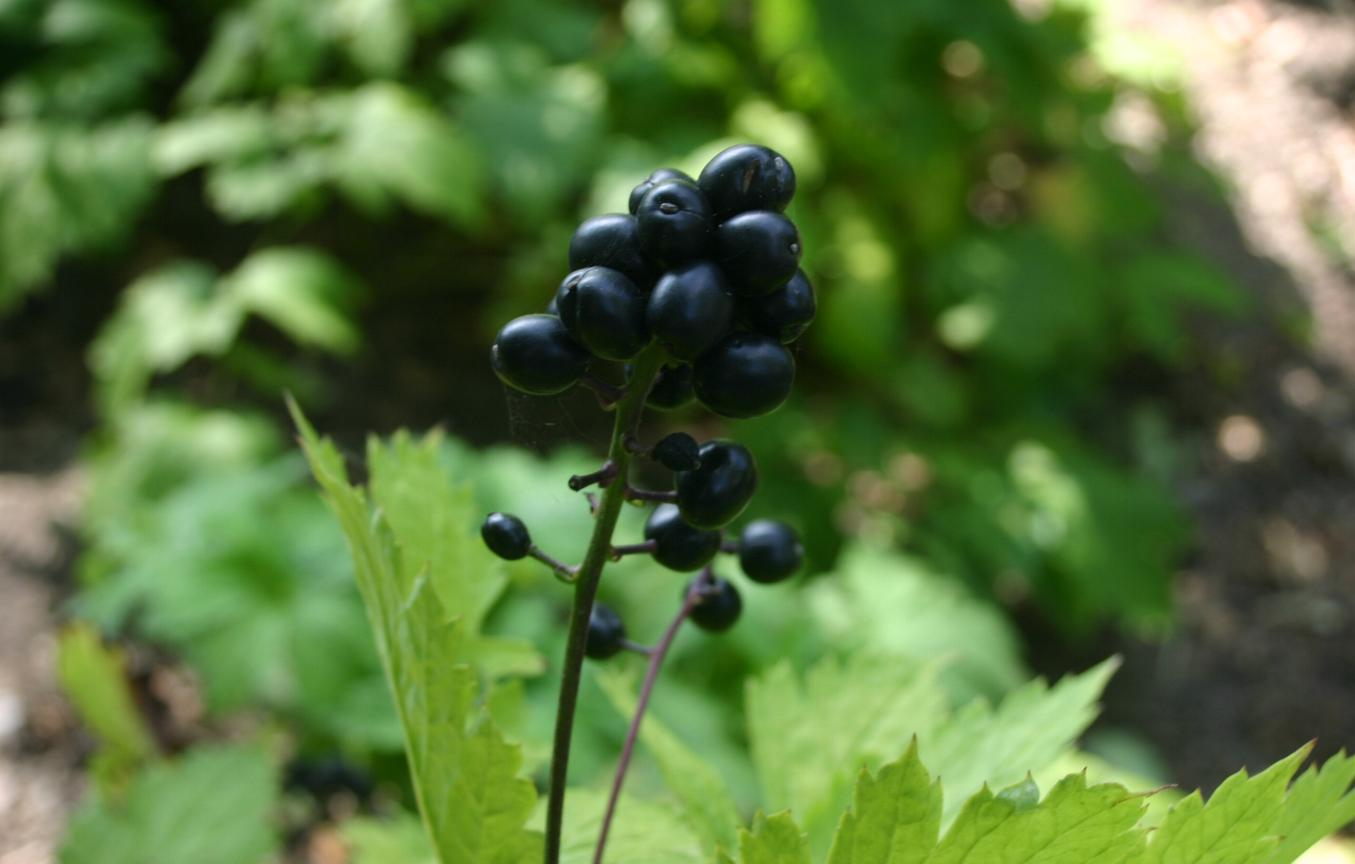
Ripe berries

Actaea spicata was first described by Carl Linnaeus in 1753. Two varieties have been recognized:

- Actaea spicata var. spicata. Europe, northwestern Asia.
- Actaea spicata var. acuminata (syn. A. acuminata). Pakistan, India and the Himalayas, above 2,000 m (6,560 ft) altitude.

== Ecology ==
Granivorous rodents sometimes remove the fruits, consuming most of the seeds but only a small proportion of the fruit's pulp. As some seeds inevitably escape predation, they also act as seed dispersers.

== Cultivation ==
Actaea spicata is cultivated as an ornamental plant. It is toxic by ingestion, and is also an irritant, so requires careful handling. It has been used as a homeopathic remedy for arthritis and joint pain.

== Bibliography ==
- Ehrlén, Johan; Eriksson, Ove (1993). "Toxicity in Fleshy Fruits: A Non-Adaptive Trait?". Oikos. 66 (1): 107–113. doi:10.2307/3545202. ISSN 0030-1299. JSTOR 3545202.
- Ehrlén, Johan; Eriksson, Ove (1991). "Phenological variation in fruit characteristics in vertebrate-dispersed plants". Oecologia. 86 (4): 463–470. doi:10.1007/BF00318311. ISSN 0029-8549.
