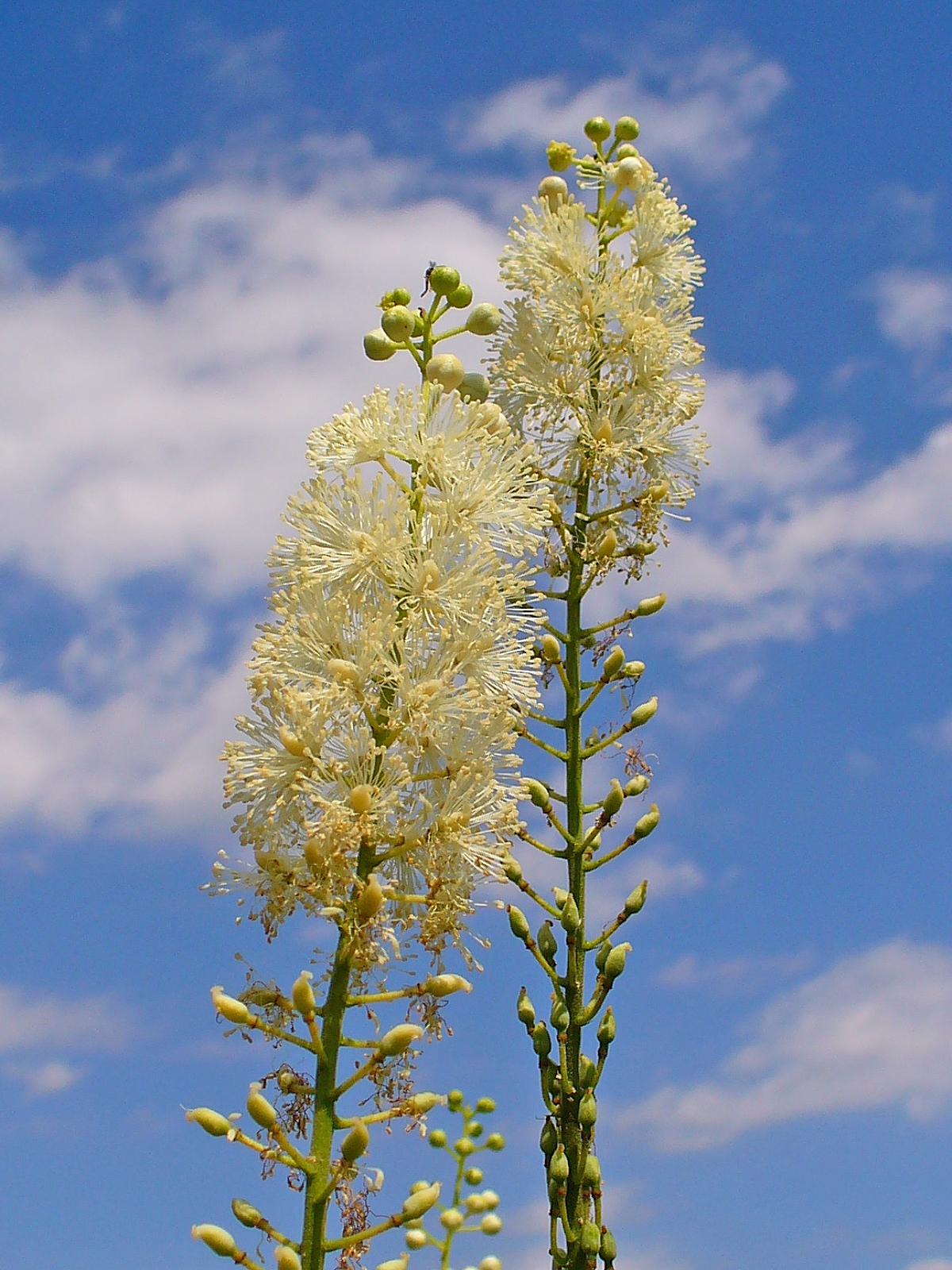
- Inflorescence

Conservation status
- Apparently Secure (NatureServe)

Scientific classification
- Kingdom: Plantae
- Clade: Tracheophytes
- Clade: Angiosperms
- Clade: Eudicots
- Order: Ranunculales
- Family: Ranunculaceae
- Genus: Actaea
- Species: A. racemosa

Binomial name
- Actaea racemosa L.

Synonyms
- Synonymy: Cimicifuga repens (L) Nutt; Cimicifuga americana Muhl; Actaea gyrostachya Wender; Actaea monogyna Walter; Actaea orthostachya Wender; Botrophis actaeoides Raf ex Fisch & CA Mey; Botrophis pumila Raf; Botrophis serpentaria Raf

= Actaea racemosa =

Species of plant

Actaea racemosa, the black cohosh, black bugbane, black snakeroot, rattle-top, or fairy candle (syn. Cimicifuga racemosa), is a species of flowering plant of the family Ranunculaceae. It is native to eastern North America from the extreme south of Ontario to central Georgia, and west to Missouri and Arkansas. It grows in a variety of woodland habitats, and is often found in small woodland openings.

The roots and rhizomes are used in traditional medicine by Native Americans. Its extracts are manufactured as herbal medicines or dietary supplements. Most dietary supplements containing black cohosh are not well-studied or recommended for safe and effective use in treating menopause symptoms or any disease. A thorough literature profiling suggests that Cimicifuga racemosa is more efficient compared to a placebo in treating vasomotor symptoms resulting from natural menopause. The present review clearly encapsulates the use of CR extract for effective and safe therapy to alleviate menopausal symptoms.

== Taxonomy ==
The plant species has a history of taxonomic uncertainty. Carl Linnaeus, on the basis of morphological characteristics of the inflorescence and seeds, placed the species into the genus Actaea. This designation was later revised by Thomas Nuttall reclassifying the species to the genus Cimicifuga. Nuttall's classification was based solely on the dry follicles produced by black cohosh, which are typical of species in Cimicifuga. However, recent data from morphological and gene phylogeny analyses demonstrate that black cohosh is more closely related to species of the genus Actaea than to other Cimicifuga species. This has prompted the revision to Actaea racemosa as originally proposed by Linnaeus. Blue cohosh (Caulophyllum thalictroides), despite its similar common name belongs to another family, the Berberidaceae, is not closely related to black cohosh, and may be unsafe if used together.

== Description ==
Black cohosh is a smooth (glabrous) herbaceous perennial plant that produces large, compound leaves from an underground rhizome, reaching a height of 25–60 cm (9.8–23.6 in). The basal leaves are up to 1 m (3 ft 3 in) long and broad, forming repeated sets of three leaflets (tripinnately compound) having a coarsely toothed (serrated) margin.

The flowers are produced in late spring and early summer on a tall stem, 75–250 cm (30–98 in) tall, forming racemes up to 50 cm (20 in) long. The flowers have no petals or sepals, and consist of tight clusters of 55–110 white, 5–10 mm (0.20–0.39 in) long stamens surrounding a white stigma. The flowers have a distinctly sweet, fetid smell that attracts flies, gnats, and beetles.

The fruit is a dry follicle 5–10 mm (0.20–0.39 in) long, with one carpel, containing several seeds.

== Cultivation ==
A. racemosa grows in dependably moist, fairly heavy soil. It bears tall tapering racemes of white midsummer flowers on wiry black-purple stems, whose mildly unpleasant, medicinal smell at close range gives it the common name "Bugbane". The drying seed heads stay handsome in the garden for many weeks. Its deeply cut, superficially maple-like leaves, burgundy colored in the variety "atropurpurea", add interest to gardens, wherever summer heat and drought do not make it die back, which make it a popular garden perennial. It has gained the Royal Horticultural Society's Award of Garden Merit.

The plant was Virginia Native Plant Society's 2017 wildflower of the year.

== Traditional and alternative medicine ==
=== History ===
Native Americans used black cohosh in the belief it could treat gynecological and other disorders. The plant appeared in the U.S. Pharmacopoeia under the name "black snakeroot" during the year 1830. In the 19th century, the root was used to treat snakebite, inflamed lungs, and pain from childbirth.

=== Herbalism ===
Extracts from the underground parts of the plant — the rhizome (Cimicifugae racemosae rhizoma) and the root (Cimicifugae racemosae radix) — are used in herbal medicine. The rhizomes and roots contain various saponins (triterpene saponins and triterpene glycosides, such as actein) as well as cimifugic acids and other phenol carboxylic acids.

Black cohosh products have received regulatory approval as herbal medicines across much of Europe, as well as in China, Malaysia, Thailand, Argentina, and several other countries. These approvals ensure consistent pharmaceutical quality, safety, and effectiveness in treating common menopausal symptoms, including hot flushes and excessive sweating. In other countries such as the United States and India, black cohosh is used as a dietary supplement marketed mainly for treatment of menopausal symptoms and other gynecological problems. Meta-analyses of current evidence back these claims for menopausal symptoms only in products that hold an official marketing authorization for this indication.

For all other products, no high-quality scientific evidence exists to support such uses.

=== Safety concerns ===
There is a lack of long term safety information for black cohosh.

The Herbal Medicinal Product Committee (HMPC) at the European Medicines Agency (EMA) has summarized the adverse drug reactions of herbal medicines made from cimicifuga with mentioning allergic skin reactions (urticaria, itching, exanthema), facial oedema and peripheral oedema, and gastrointestinal symptoms (i.e. dyspeptic disorders, diarrhoea).

Black cohosh does not show harmful effects on endometrium or breast cancer survivors. In contrast, such studies have not been published for dietary supplements made from black cohosh. Most black cohosh materials are harvested from the wild. Lack of proper authentication and adulteration of commercial preparations by other plant species are risk factors in dietary supplements and a critical matter of quality control in herbal medicinal products holding a marketing authorization. Very high doses of black cohosh may cause nausea, dizziness, visual effects, a lower heart rate, and increased perspiration.

Worldwide, some 83 cases of liver damage, including hepatitis, liver failure, and elevated liver enzymes, have been associated with using black cohosh, although a cause-and-effect relationship remains undefined. The clinical picture is similar to an autoimmune hepatitis with centrilobular liver cell necrosis, which can be treated with corticosteroids. Package leaflets of phytomedicines made from black cohosh caution that people with liver problems should not take it,

In 2007, the Australian Government warned that black cohosh may cause liver damage, although rarely, and should not be used without medical supervision. Other studies concluded that liver damage from use of black cohosh is unlikely.

Millions of women have taken black cohosh without reporting adverse health effects, and a meta-analysis of clinical trials found no evidence that black cohosh preparations had adverse effects on liver function.

=== Phytochemicals ===
The rhizomes and roots of black cohosh (Cimicifuga racemosa rhizoma) contain diverse phytochemicals, particularly triterpene glycosides, such as actein and cimicifugoside, cimicifugin, caffeic acid, various saponins, and phenolic acids.

Cimigenol, a constituent of black cohosh

Formononetin, a constituent of methanolic black cohosh extracts but not of commercially available ethanolic or isopropanolic extracts

== Gallery ==
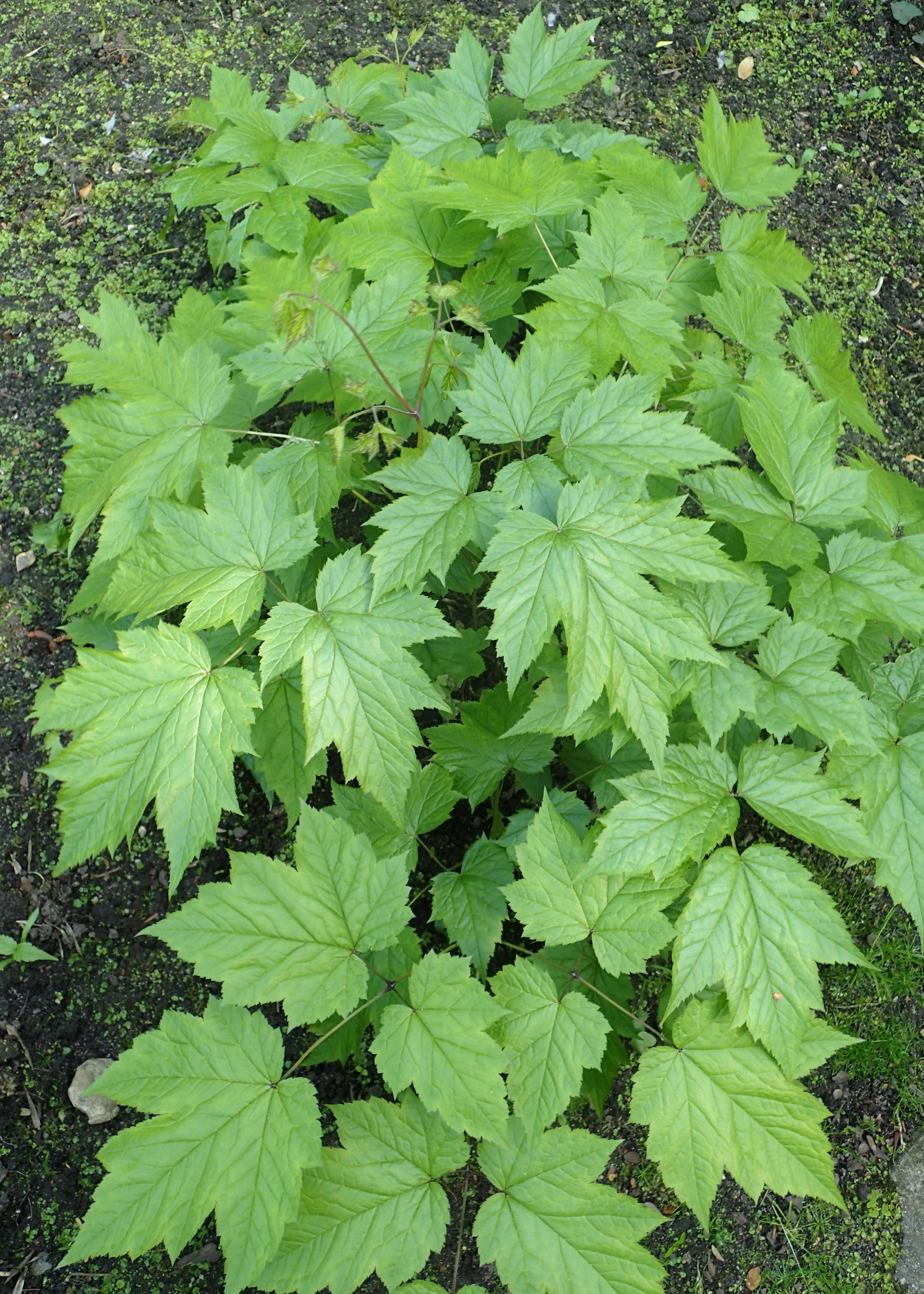
Leaves

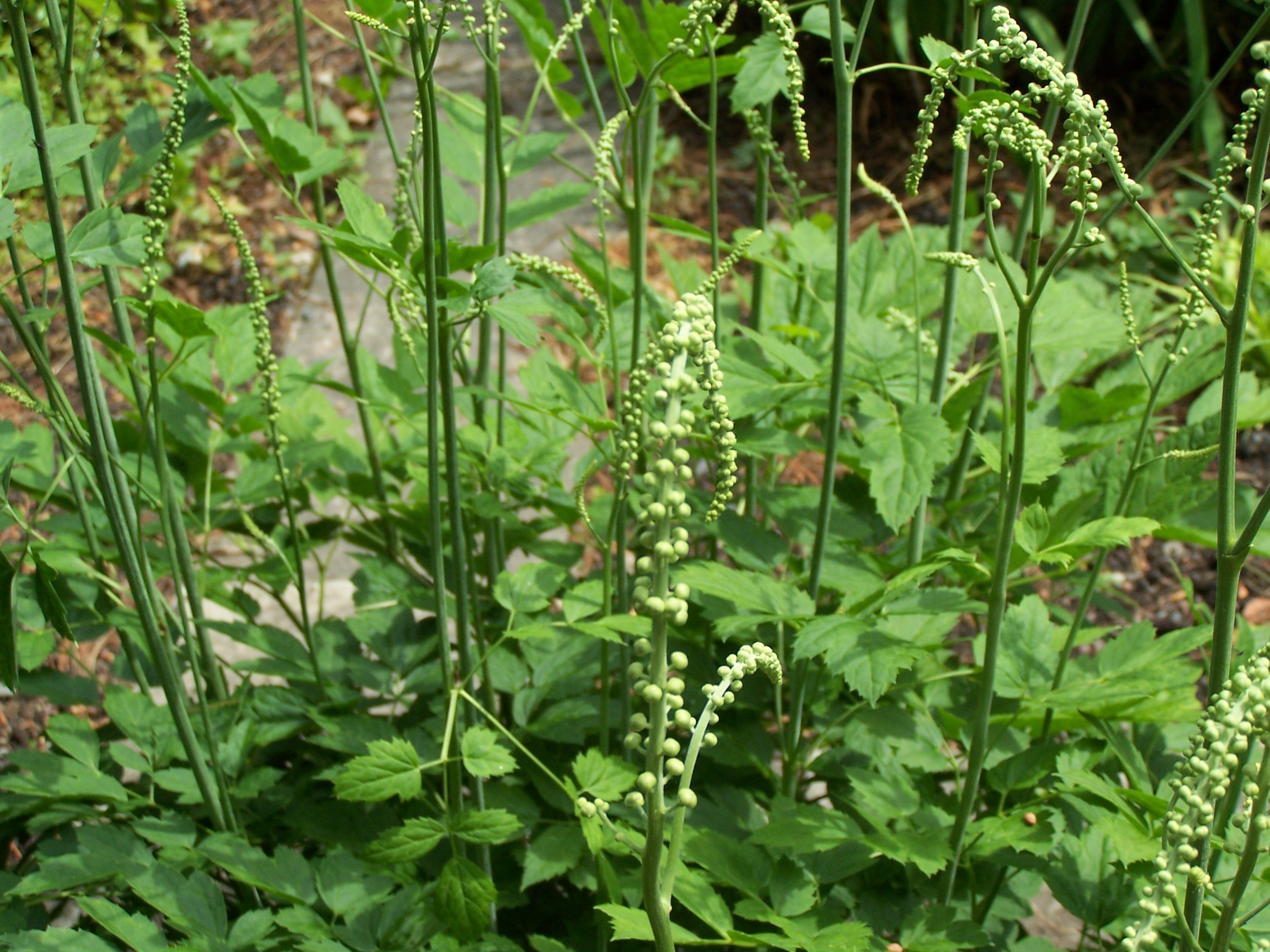
Budding plants in cultivation

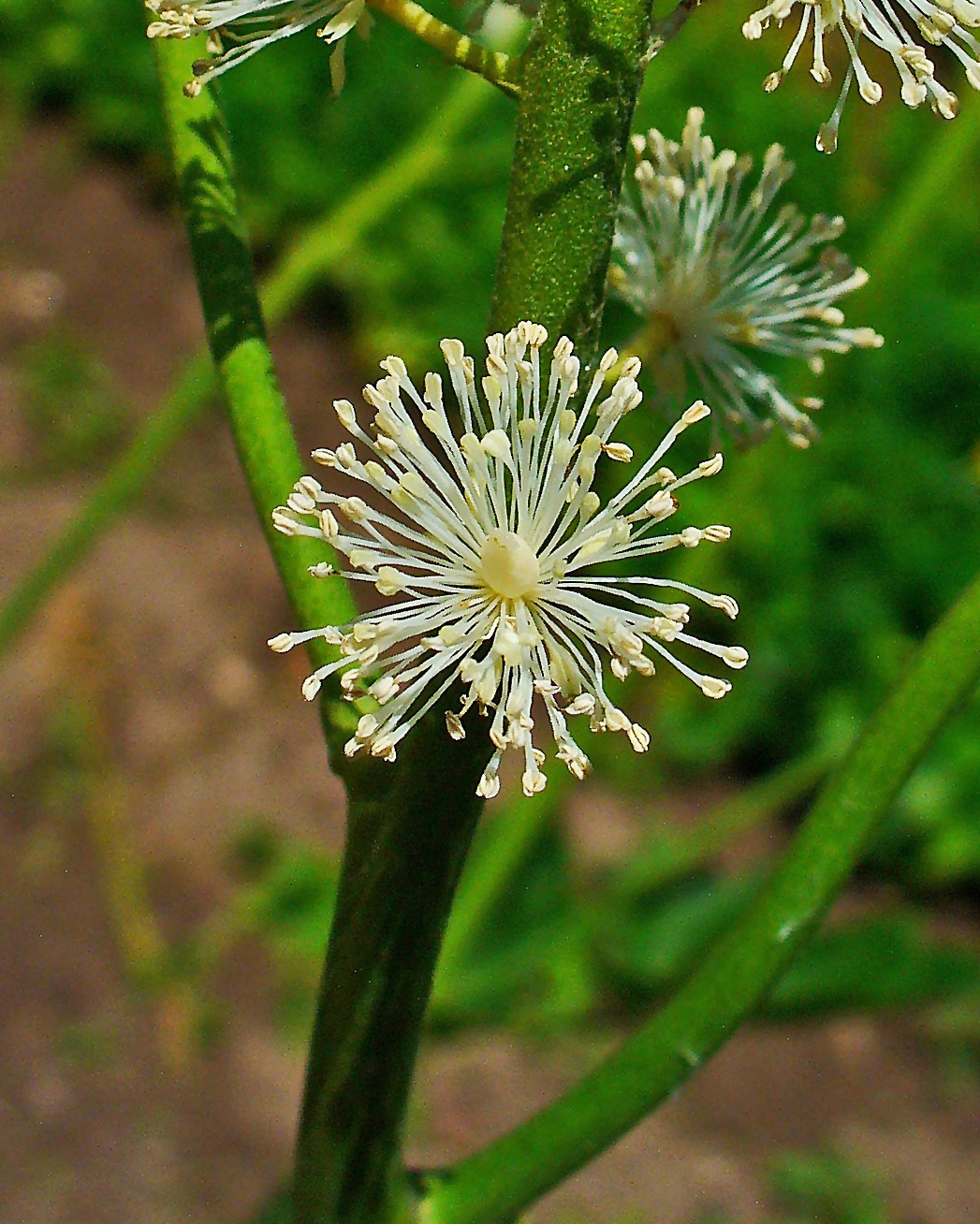
Close-up of the flower

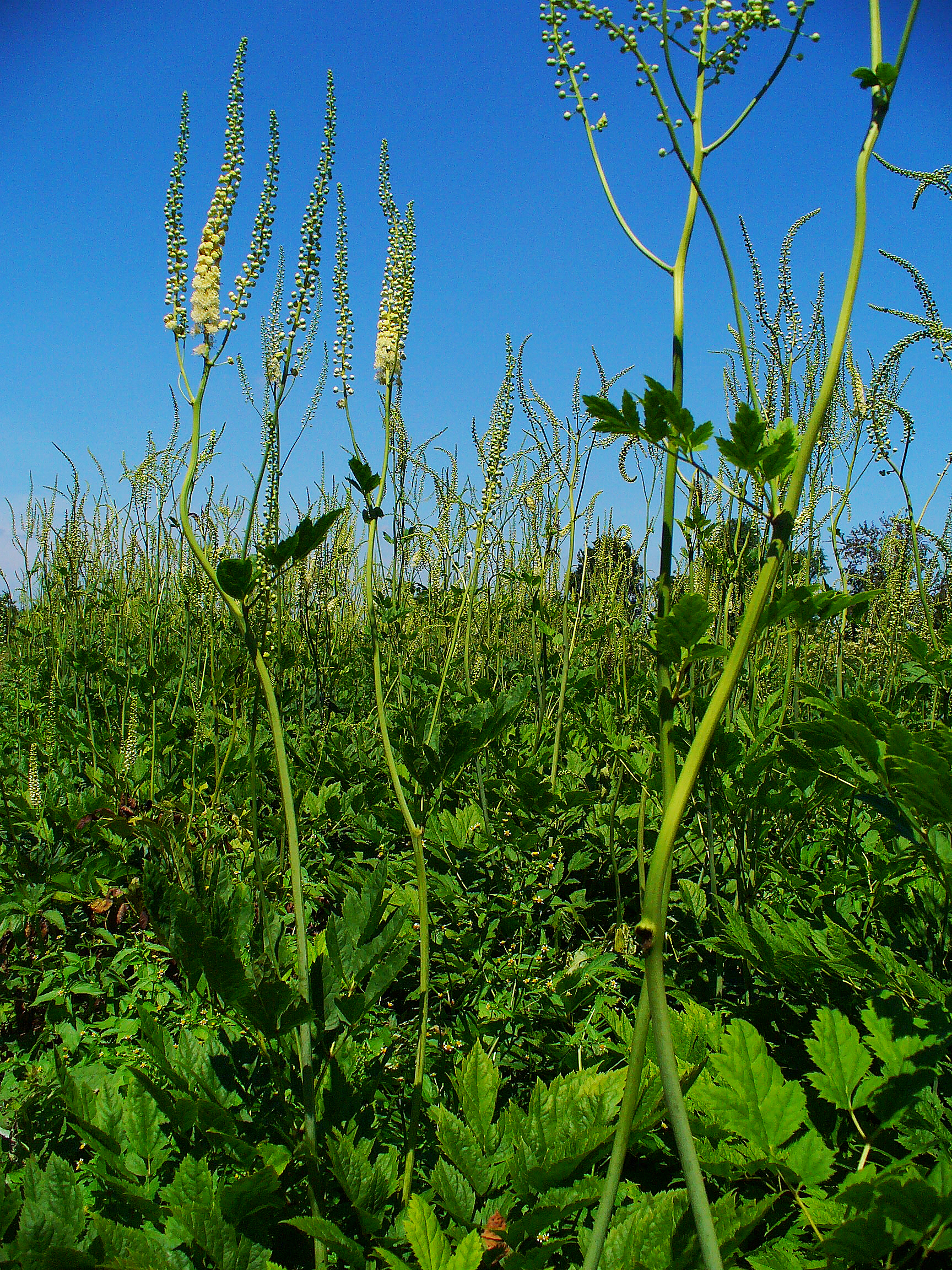
Mature plant

== See also ==
- Caffeic acid
- Ferulic acid
- List of unproven and disproven cancer treatments
- Phenylpropanoids
- Triterpenoids
