= C. expansus =

C. expansus may refer to:

- Corybas expansus, the flared helmet orchid, a species of terrestrial orchid
- Cryptolithodes expansus, a species of king crab
- Cyclophorus expansus, a species of gastropod in the family Cyclophoridae
- Cyperus expansus, a species of sedge native to Réunion
