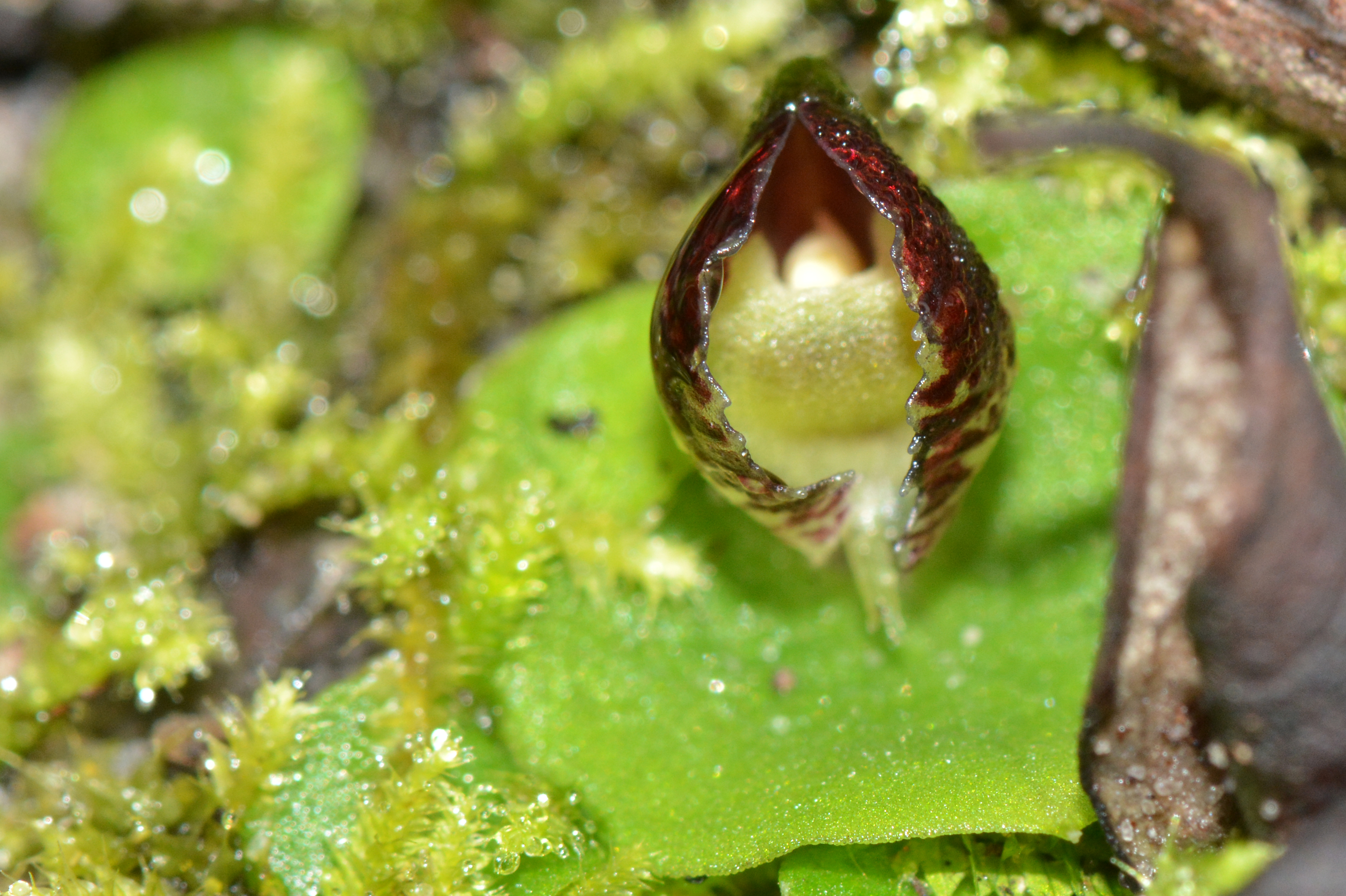
- Near Albany

Scientific classification
- Kingdom: Plantae
- Clade: Tracheophytes
- Clade: Angiosperms
- Clade: Monocots
- Order: Asparagales
- Family: Orchidaceae
- Subfamily: Orchidoideae
- Tribe: Diurideae
- Genus: Corybas
- Species: C. despectans

Binomial name
- Corybas despectans D.L.Jones & R.C.Nash

Synonyms
- Corysanthes despectans (D.L.Jones & R.C.Nash) D.L.Jones & M.A.Clem.

= Corybas despectans =

Tiny helmet orchid

Species of orchid

Corybas despectans, commonly known as tiny helmet orchid or sandhill helmet orchid is a species of terrestrial orchid endemic to southern Australia. It has round or heart-shaped leaf and a tiny reddish purple flower. Unlike many others in the genus, the dorsal sepal does not cover the labellum. It is similar to C. incurvus but the flowers are smaller.

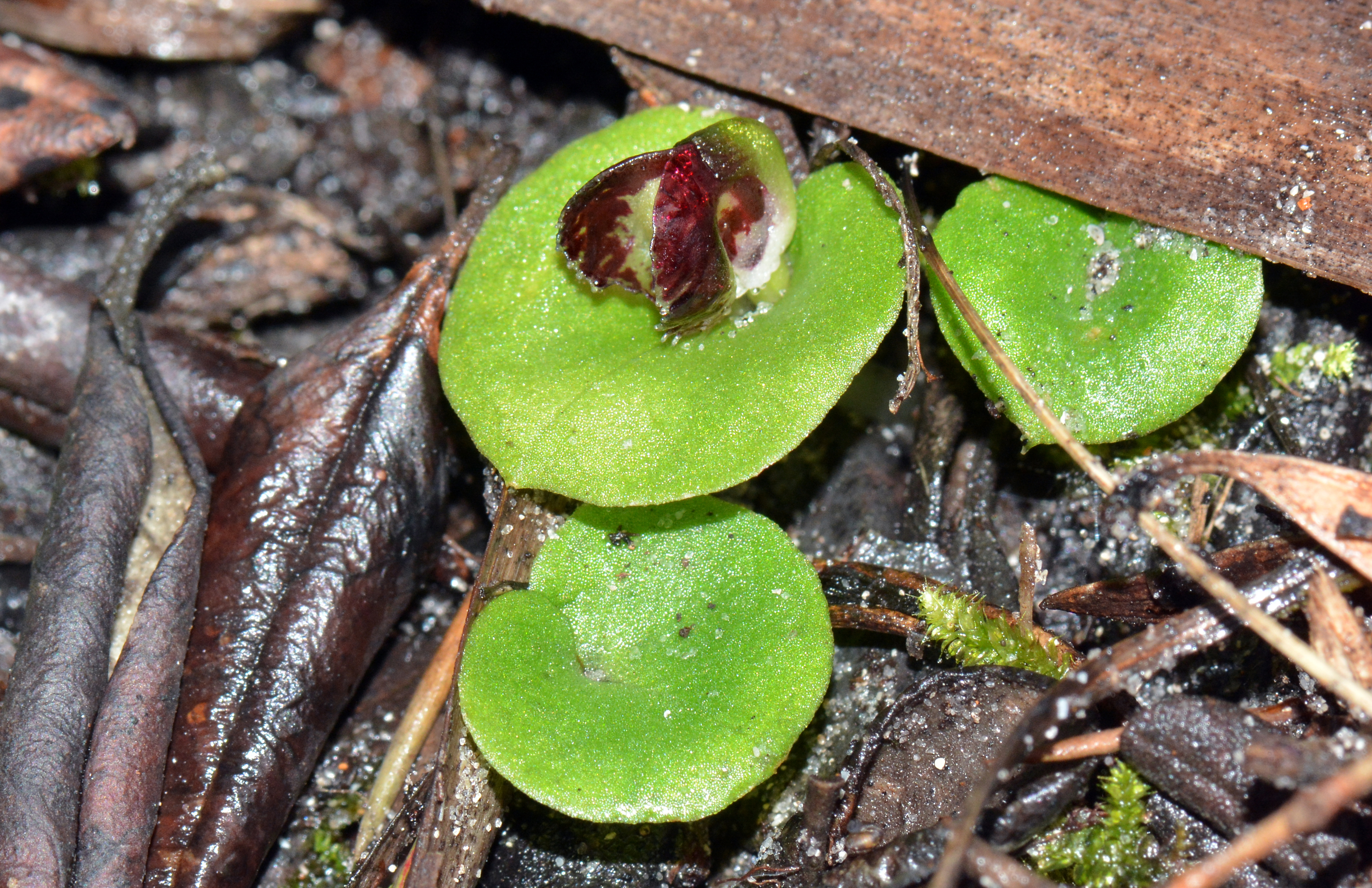
Corybas despectans leaf

== Description ==
Corybas despectans is a terrestrial, perennial, deciduous, herb with a single round or heart-shaped leaf 8–25 mm (0.3–1 in) long and 12–30 mm (0.5–1 in) wide. The leaf is green on the upper surface and silvery green on the lower side. There is a single erect, reddish purple flower with green or translucent areas, 7–12 mm (0.3–0.5 in) long and 9–11 mm (0.35–0.43 in) wide. The dorsal sepal is greenish grey, erect in the lower part then curves, 6–11 mm (0.2–0.4 in) long and 3–4 mm (0.1–0.2 in) wide and does not usually completely cover the labellum. The lateral sepals are about 5 mm (0.2 in) long, 1 mm (0.04 in) wide and joined at their bases before tapering to a fine tip. The petals are about 2 mm (0.08 in) long, 1 mm (0.04 in) wide, widest at the base then tapering to a thread-like tip. The labellum is longer than the dorsal sepal, 7–8 mm (0.28–0.31 in) long, 9–11 mm (0.35–0.43 in) wide and reddish with obvious veins. Flowering occurs from June to September.

== Taxonomy ==
Corybas despectans was first formally described in 1976 by David Jones and R.C. Nash from a specimen collected near Warooka and the description was published in Muelleria. The specific epithet (despectans) is a Latin word meaning "look down upon".

In 2002, David Jones and Mark Clements proposed splitting Corybas into smaller genera and placing this species into Corysanthes but the change has not been widely accepted.

== Distribution and habitat ==
Tiny helmet orchid forms colonies in forests and scrubland and is very common in some places. It occurs disjunctly in western Victoria and on the Mornington Peninsula, in the south-east of South Australia including Kangaroo Island and in Western Australia between Bunbury and Israelite Bay.
