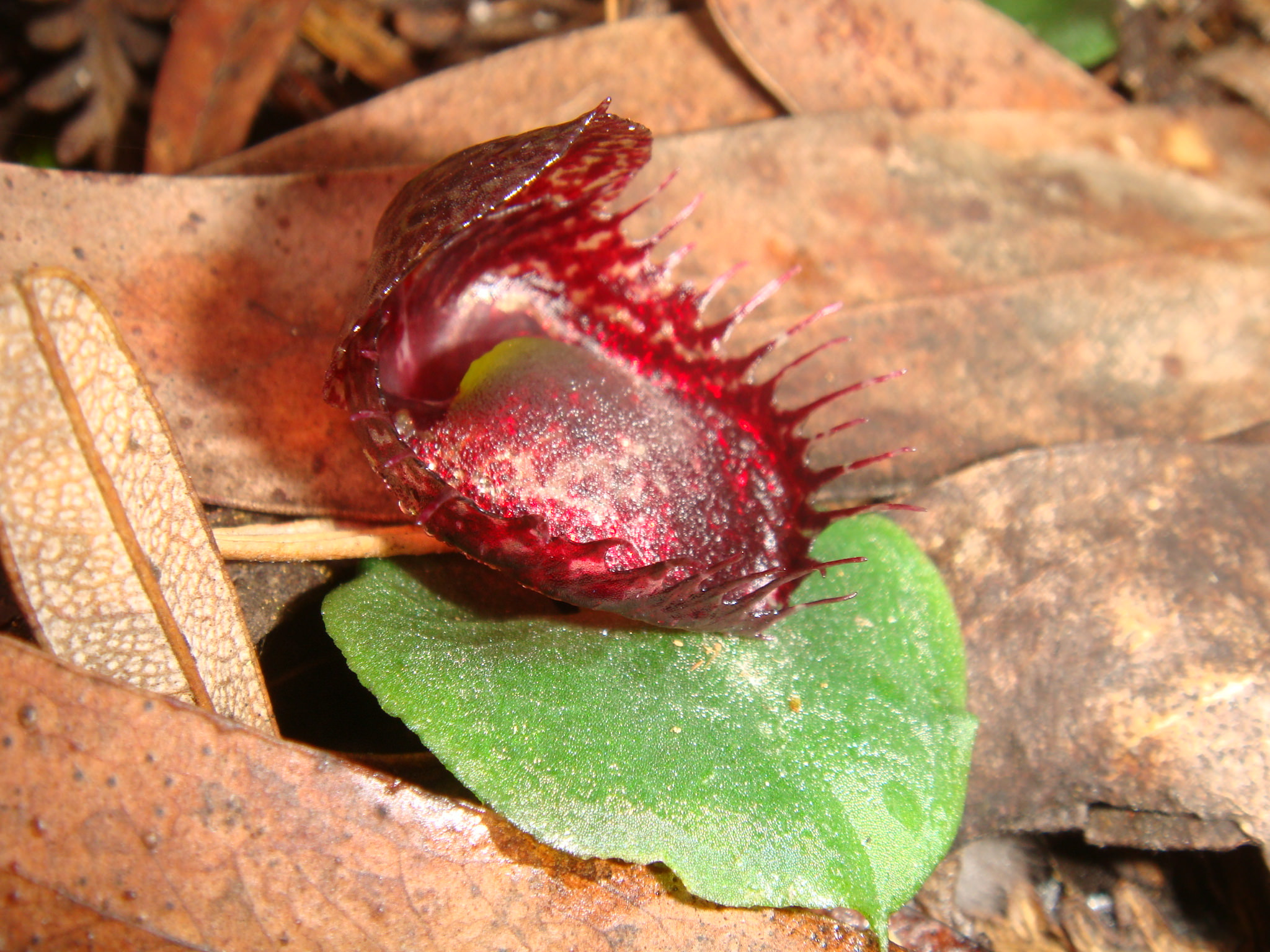
- Corybas fimbriatus at Coles Bay

Scientific classification
- Kingdom: Plantae
- Clade: Tracheophytes
- Clade: Angiosperms
- Clade: Monocots
- Order: Asparagales
- Family: Orchidaceae
- Subfamily: Orchidoideae
- Tribe: Diurideae
- Genus: Corybas
- Species: C. fimbriatus

Binomial name
- Corybas fimbriatus (R.Br.) Rchb.f.

Synonyms
- Corysanthes fimbriata R.Br.; Corybas callosus Blume; Corysanthes callosa (Blume) Blume

= Corybas fimbriatus =

Fringed helmet orchid

Species of orchid

Corybas fimbriatus, commonly known as the fringed helmet orchid, is a species of terrestrial orchid endemic to eastern Australia. It has a broad egg-shaped to round leaf and a dark reddish purple to crimson flower with translucent patches. It is similar to C. hispidus but its labellum lacks a creamy-white centre and is not covered with bristly hairs.

== Description ==
Corybas fimbriatus is a terrestrial, perennial, deciduous, herb with a single broad egg-shaped to round leaf 15–40 mm (0.6–2 in) long and wide. The leaf is dark green on the upper surface and silvery green on the lower side. There is a single dark reddish purple to crimson flower with translucent patches. The dorsal sepal is 20–25 mm (0.8–1 in) long and 15–18 mm (0.6–0.7 in) wide and concave, partly forming a hood over the labellum. The lateral sepals are linear, about 5 mm (0.2 in) long and usually joined to each other. The petals are linear and about 4 mm (0.2 in) long. The labellum is about 15 mm (0.6 in) long with a transparent central mound and has many long, narrow teeth on the edges. Flowering occurs from May to August.

== Taxonomy ==
The fringed helmet orchid was first formally described in 1810 by Robert Brown and given the name Corysanthes fimbriatus. The description was published in Brown's book Prodromus Florae Novae Hollandiae et Insulae Van Diemen. In 1871 Heinrich Gustav Reichenbach changed the name to Corybas fimbriatus. The specific epithet (fimbriatus) is a Latin word meaning "fringed" or "fibrous".

== Distribution and habitat ==
Corybas fimbriatus is widespread and common, growing in heath and moist forest. It occurs in Queensland south from Gympie, on the coast and ranges of New South Wales, in south-east Victoria and in Tasmania. There is also an isolated population on the Atherton Tableland.

== Use in horticulture ==
Although usually only cultivated by orchid enthusiasts, C. fimbriatus is more easily grown than other orchids in the same genus. It is grown in a free draining, sandy mix and requires good air circulation with 50% sun.
