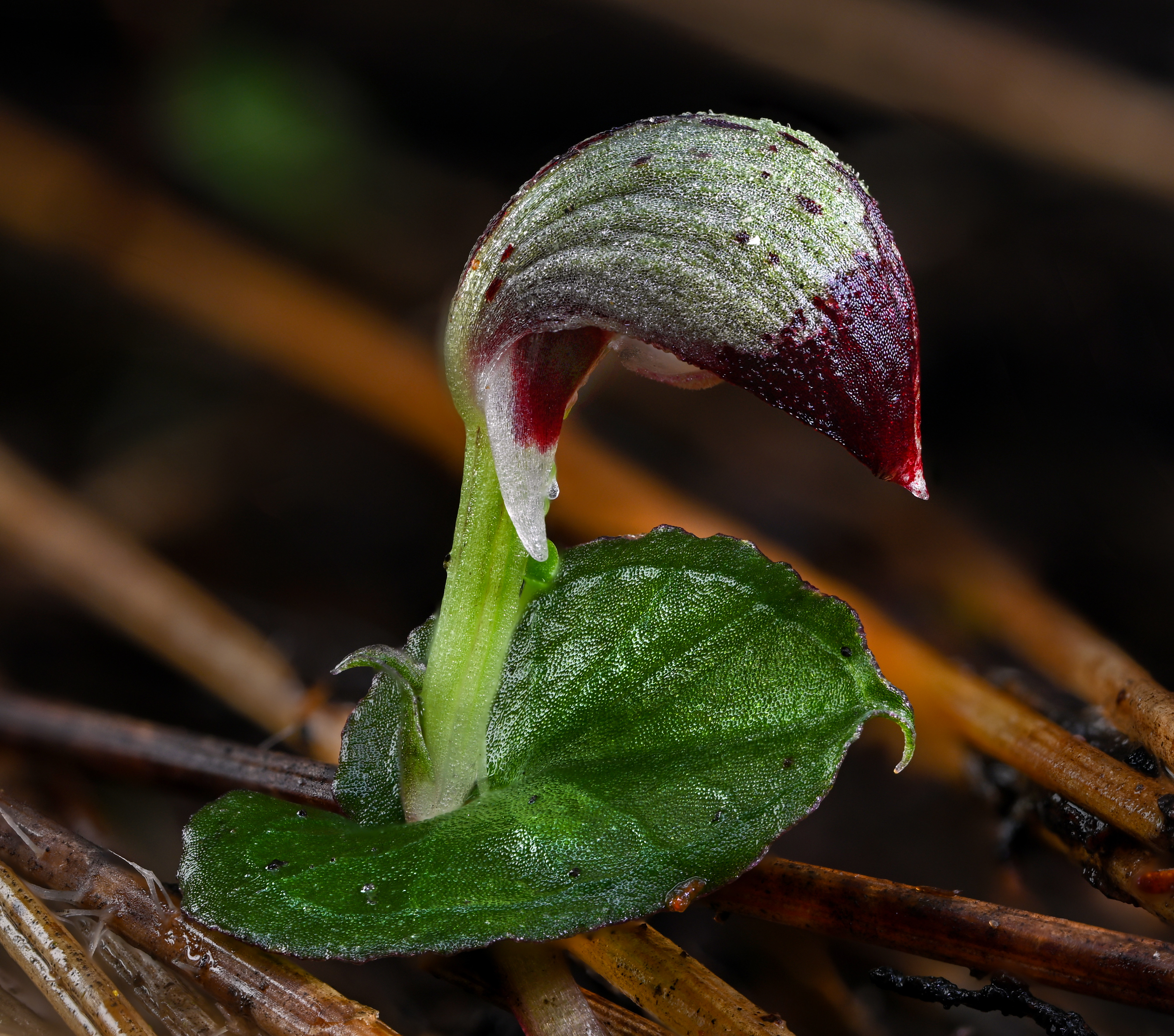
- Corybas cheesemanii near Auckland

Scientific classification
- Kingdom: Plantae
- Clade: Tracheophytes
- Clade: Angiosperms
- Clade: Monocots
- Order: Asparagales
- Family: Orchidaceae
- Subfamily: Orchidoideae
- Tribe: Diurideae
- Genus: Corybas
- Species: C. cheesemanii

Binomial name
- Corybas cheesemanii (Hook.f. ex Kirk) Kuntze

Synonyms
- Corysanthes cheesemanii Hook.f. ex Kirk

= Corybas cheesemanii =

Cheesemans spider orchid

Species of orchid

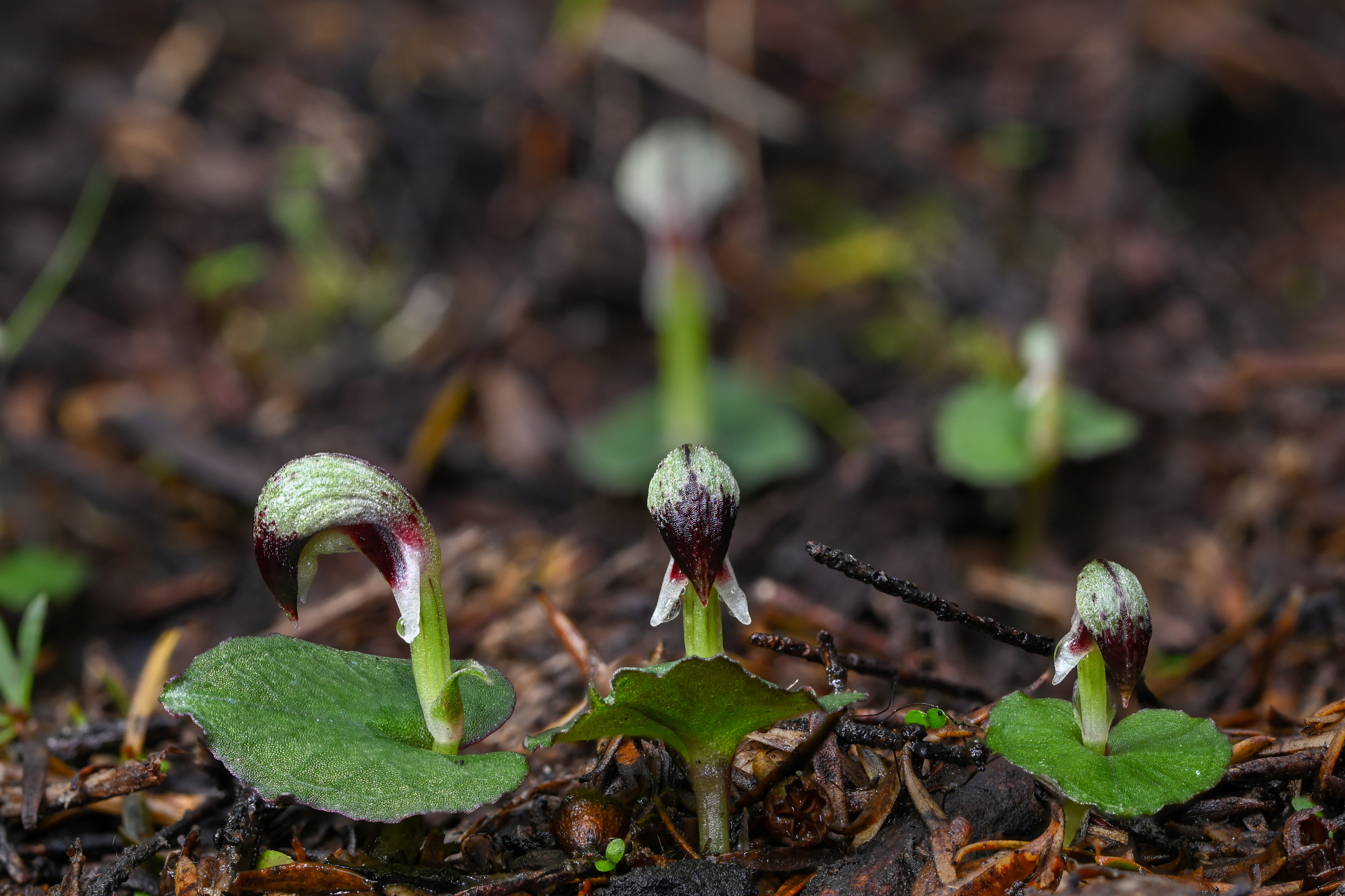
Corybas cheesemanii

Corybas cheesemanii, commonly known as Cheesemans spider orchid or spurred helmet orchid, is a species of terrestrial orchid endemic to New Zealand. It is a small orchid with a single pale green, heart-shaped leaf and usually only a single flower variously coloured from maroon to completely white. It usually grows in deep shade, often in deep leaf litter and flowers in autumn and winter.

== Description ==
Corybas cheesemanii is a terrestrial, perennial, deciduous, herb with a single heart-shaped to almost round leaf 10–20 mm (0.4–0.8 in) long but which is sometimes only a small green scale. The leaf is green on the upper surface and silvery green on the lower side. There is usually only a single flower varying in colour from dark pink through greyish white with purple specks or all white, and reaching to a height of 10–14 mm (0.4–0.6 in). The largest part of the flower is the dorsal sepal which is hood-like, completely covering the rest of the flower. The lateral sepals are tiny and the petals are usually not detectable. The labellum is cream-coloured or white, tube-shaped near the base with a narrow spur pointing downwards on either side at its base. Flowering occurs from May to September and is followed by a fruiting capsule which is up to 20 mm (0.8 in) on an elongated stem up to 220 mm (9 in) tall.

== Taxonomy ==
This orchid was first formally described in 1871 by Thomas Kirk after an unpublished description by Joseph Dalton Hooker. Kirk gave it the name Corysanthes cheesemanii from specimens collected by Thomas Frederick Cheeseman and published the description in Transactions and Proceedings of the New Zealand Institute. In 1891, Otto Kuntze changed the name to Corybas cheesemanii. The specific epithet (cheesemanii) honours the collector of the type specimens.

== Distribution and habitat ==
Cheesemans spider orchid grows in deep shade, often buried in deep rotting leaf litter in tall scrub or forest. It occurs on the North, South, Three Kings and Chatham Islands.

== Conservation ==
Corybas cheesemanii is classified as "not threatened" by the New Zealand Government Department of Conservation.
