= Corybas longipetalus =

Scientific classification
- Kingdom: Plantae
- Clade: Embryophytes
- Clade: Tracheophytes
- Clade: Spermatophytes
- Clade: Angiosperms
- Clade: Monocots
- Order: Asparagales
- Family: Orchidaceae
- Subfamily: Orchidoideae
- Tribe: Diurideae
- Genus: Corybas
- Species: C. longipetalus

Binomial name
- Corybas longipetalus (Ridl.) Schltr.

Synonyms
- Calcearia longipetala (Ridl.) M.A.Clem. & D.L.Jones; Corysanthes longipetala Ridl.

Species of flowering plant

Corybas longipetalus (Ridl.) Schltr. is a species of flowering plant in the family Orchidaceae, native to New Guinea. It was first described by Henry Nicholas Ridley in 1916 as Corysanthes longipetala.
