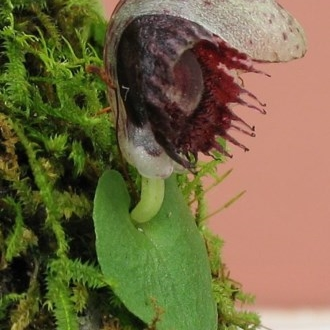

Scientific classification
- Kingdom: Plantae
- Clade: Embryophytes
- Clade: Tracheophytes
- Clade: Spermatophytes
- Clade: Angiosperms
- Clade: Monocots
- Order: Asparagales
- Family: Orchidaceae
- Subfamily: Orchidoideae
- Tribe: Diurideae
- Genus: Corybas
- Species: C. pruinosus

Binomial name
- Corybas pruinosus (R.Cunn.) Rchb.f.

Synonyms
- Corysanthes pruinosa R.Cunn.

= Corybas pruinosus =

Toothed helmet orchid

Species of orchid

Corybas pruinosus, commonly known as the toothed helmet orchid, is a species of terrestrial orchid endemic to New South Wales. It grows in moist forests and has a single round or heart-shaped leaf and a relatively small, translucent grey flower with dark red markings.

== Description ==
Corybas pruinosus is a terrestrial, perennial, deciduous, herb with a single round or heart-shaped leaf 8–30 mm (0.3–1 in) long and 10–20 mm (0.4–0.8 in) wide. The leaf is green on the upper surface and silvery green on the lower side. There is a single translucent grey flower with dark red markings. The dorsal sepal is 20–28 mm (0.8–1 in) long and 10–13 mm (0.4–0.5 in) wide curves forward over the labellum. The lateral sepals are linear, 7–10 mm (0.3–0.4 in) long and 1 mm (0.04 in) wide and the petals are about 6 mm (0.2 in) long and 1 mm (0.04 in) wide, often with two points on the tip. The labellum is 9–12 mm (0.4–0.5 in) long and 5–6 mm (0.20–0.24 in) wide with a greyish mound in the centre, many short bristles and its edges with many long, narrow teeth. Flowering occurs from April to July.

== Taxonomy ==
The toothed helmet orchid was first formally described in 1871 by Richard Cunningham and given the name Corysanthes pruinosa. The description was published in the New South Wales Magazine. In 1871, Heinrich Gustav Reichenbach changed the name to Corybas pruinosus. The specific epithet (pruinosus) is a Latin word meaning "frosty" or "rimy".

== Distribution and habitat ==
The toothed helmet orchid grows in forest with shrubs between Nelson Bay, Moruya and Paterson.
