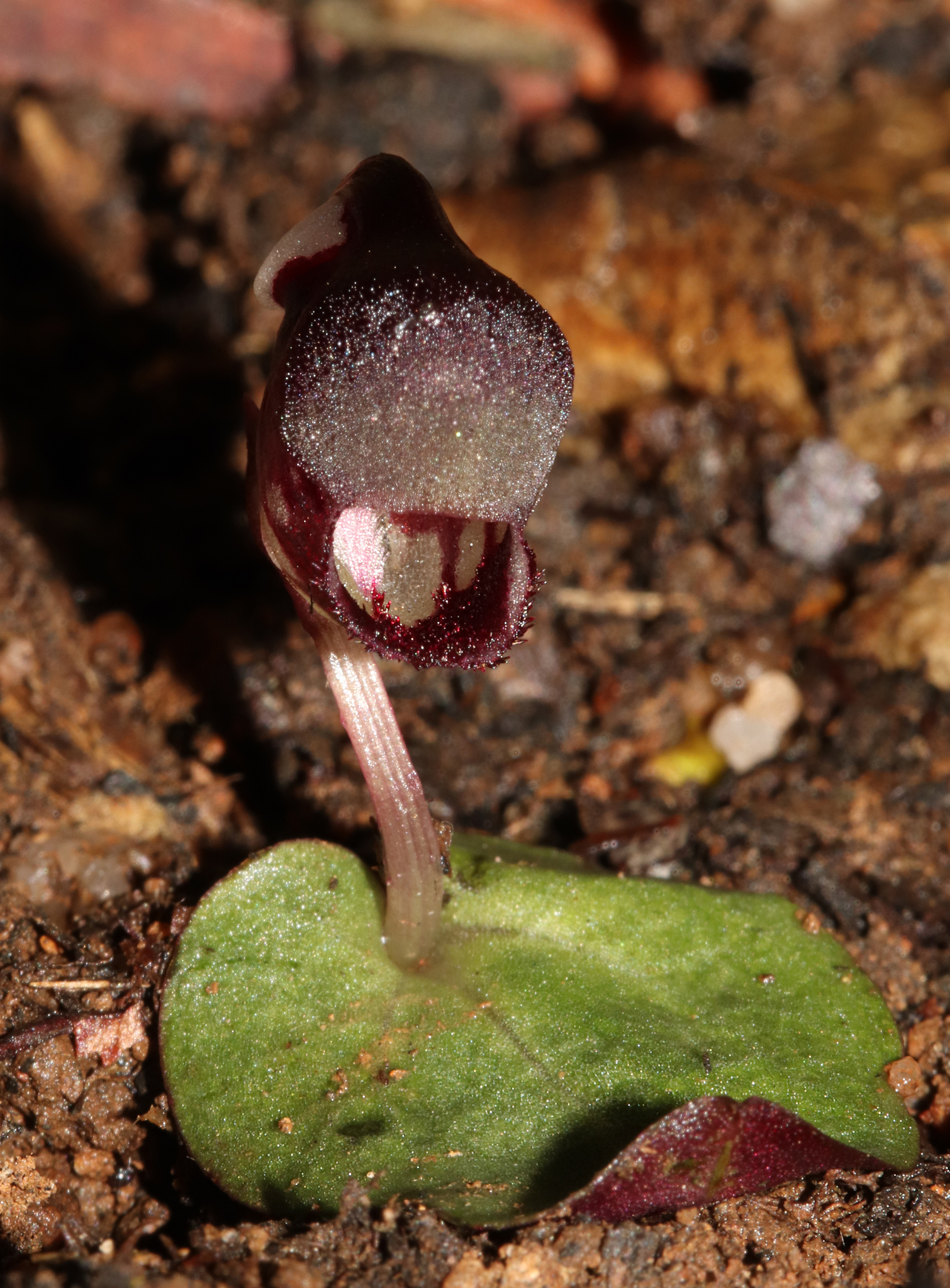

Scientific classification
- Kingdom: Plantae
- Clade: Tracheophytes
- Clade: Angiosperms
- Clade: Monocots
- Order: Asparagales
- Family: Orchidaceae
- Subfamily: Orchidoideae
- Tribe: Diurideae
- Genus: Corybas
- Species: C. globulus

Binomial name
- Corybas globulus (D.L.Jones & L.M.Copel.) L.M.Copel. & D.L.Jones

Synonyms
- Anzybas globulus D.L.Jones & L.M.Copel.

= Corybas globulus =

Species of orchid

Corybas globulus is a species of helmet orchid endemic to a small area of the New England Tableland in northern New South Wales. It is a relatively small orchid with a bright green, heart-shaped leaf and a bulbous, dark reddish purple flower.

== Description ==
Corybas globulus is a terrestrial, tuberous, herbaceous plant that forms loose clonal colonies. It has a single heart-shaped leaf 15–30 mm (0.6–1 in) long, 10–30 mm (0.4–1 in) wide and bright green with reddish edges and lower surface. The flower is more or less spherical and 10–11 mm (0.39–0.43 in) on a pinkish peduncle 5–8 mm (0.2–0.3 in) long. The dorsal sepal is dark reddish purple, 10–12 mm (0.4–0.5 in) long on a stalk 5–6 mm (0.20–0.24 in) long. The lateral sepals are 10–11 mm (0.39–0.43 in) long and the petals are about 5 mm (0.2 in) long, all in close contact with the labellum. The labellum is about as long as the dorsal sepal, tube-shaped and has three lobes. There are crowded rows of pink to red calli about 1 mm (0.04 in) long in a ridge about 2 mm (0.08 in) wide around the edge of the labellum. Flowering occurs from early May to mid June.

== Taxonomy and naming ==
This orchid was first formally described in 2016 by David Jones and Lachlan Copeland who gave it the name Anzybas globulus. The description was published in Australian Orchid Review from a specimen collected in the Washpool National Park. In the same year, the same authorities changed the name to Corybas globulus "to allow for the different taxonomic views held at generic level within the subtribe". The specific epithet (globulus) is the diminutive form of the Latin word globus meaning "ball" or "sphere", hence "little sphere" in reference to the shape of the flower of this orchid.

== Distribution and habitat ==
The orchid grows in open forest with a dense shrubby understorey. It is only known from the Washpool and Gibraltar Range National Parks.
