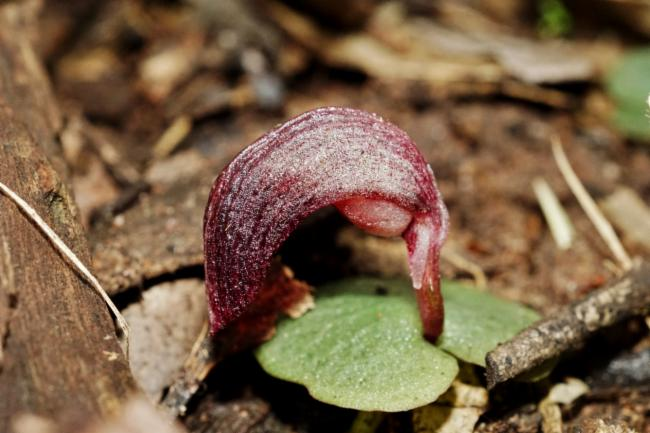

Scientific classification
- Kingdom: Plantae
- Clade: Tracheophytes
- Clade: Angiosperms
- Clade: Monocots
- Order: Asparagales
- Family: Orchidaceae
- Subfamily: Orchidoideae
- Tribe: Diurideae
- Genus: Corybas
- Species: C. dowlingii

Binomial name
- Corybas dowlingii D.L.Jones

= Corybas dowlingii =

Red lanterns

Species of orchid

Corybas dowlingii, commonly known as red lanterns, is a rare species of terrestrial orchid endemic to New South Wales. It grows in colonies and has a round or heart-shaped leaf and a dark purplish red flower with white patches in the labellum.

== Description ==
Corybas dowlingii is a terrestrial, perennial, deciduous, herb with a single round or heart-shaped leaf 15–35 mm (0.6–1 in) long and wide. The leaf is dark green on the upper surface and slightly reddish on the lower side. A single erect, dark purplish red flower, 26–32 mm (1.0–1.3 in) long and 6–10 mm (0.2–0.4 in) wide is borne on a stalk 1–2 mm (0.04–0.08 in) long. The dorsal sepal is 15–23 mm (0.6–0.9 in) long, 6–10 mm (0.2–0.4 in) wide and curved. The lateral sepals are linear, about 2 mm (0.08 in) long and 0.5 mm (0.02 in) wide, tapered and held horizontally or turned upwards towards the labellum. The petals are about 0.5 mm (0.02 in) long and hidden behind the labellum. The labellum is translucent white with red blotches and tube-shaped near its base. The tube is about 4 mm (0.2 in) long then expanded into a flat area 10–12 mm (0.4–0.5 in) long and 5–6 mm (0.20–0.24 in) wide. There are two whitish spurs about 3 mm (0.1 in) long turning downwards from the base of the labellum. Flowering occurs from June to August.

== Taxonomy ==
Corybas dowlingii was first formally described in 2004 by David Jones from a specimen collected by Bill Dowling on Bulahdelah Mountain. The description was published in The Orchadian. The specific epithet (dowlingii) honours the collector of the type specimen.

== Distribution and habitat ==
Red lanterns grows in gullies in tall forest and is only known from four localities between Bulahdelah, Port Stephens and Freemans Waterhole.

== Conservation ==
This orchid is listed as "endangered" under the New South Wales Government Biodiversity Conservation Act 2016. It is threatened by land clearing and habitat degradation, rubbish dumping and recreational overuse.
