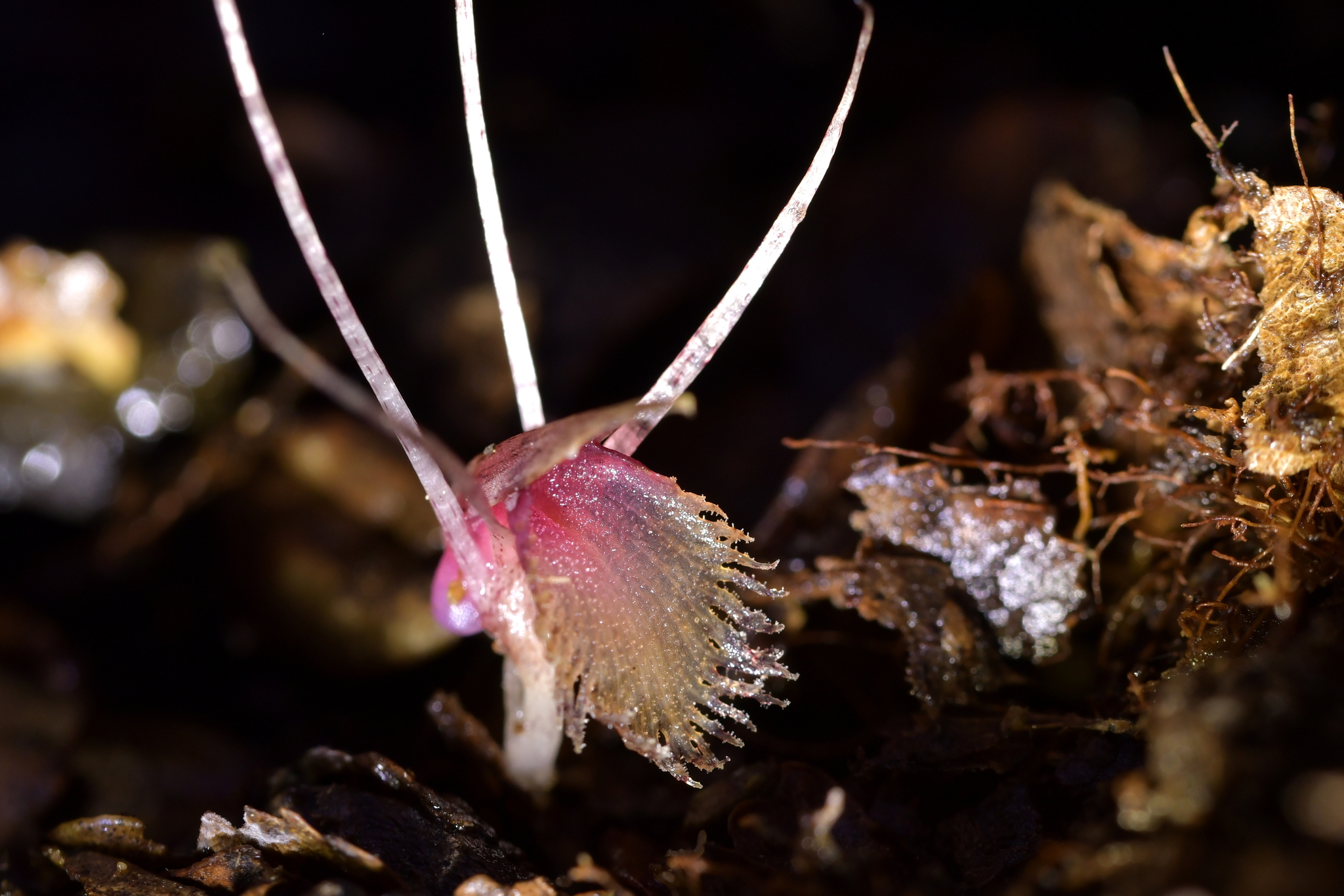

Scientific classification
- Kingdom: Plantae
- Clade: Tracheophytes
- Clade: Angiosperms
- Clade: Monocots
- Order: Asparagales
- Family: Orchidaceae
- Subfamily: Orchidoideae
- Tribe: Diurideae
- Genus: Corybas
- Species: C. cryptanthus

Binomial name
- Corybas cryptanthus Hatch

Synonyms
- Corybas saprophyticus Hatch; Corysanthes cryptantha (Hatch) Szlach.; Molloybas cryptanthus (Hatch) D.L.Jones & M.A.Clem.

= Corybas cryptanthus =

Hidden spider orchid

Species of orchid

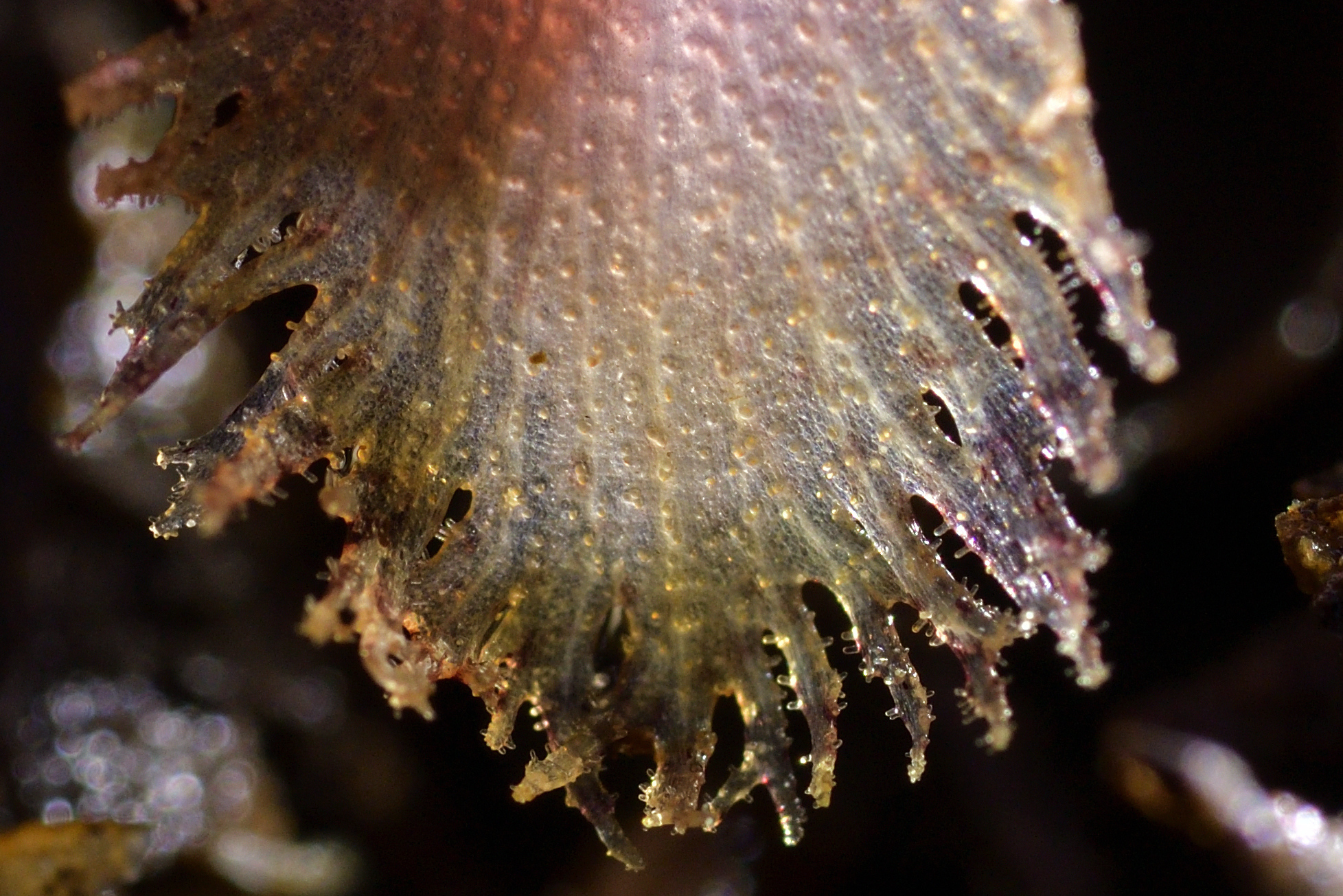
Papillose labellum, the laciniae finely ciliate

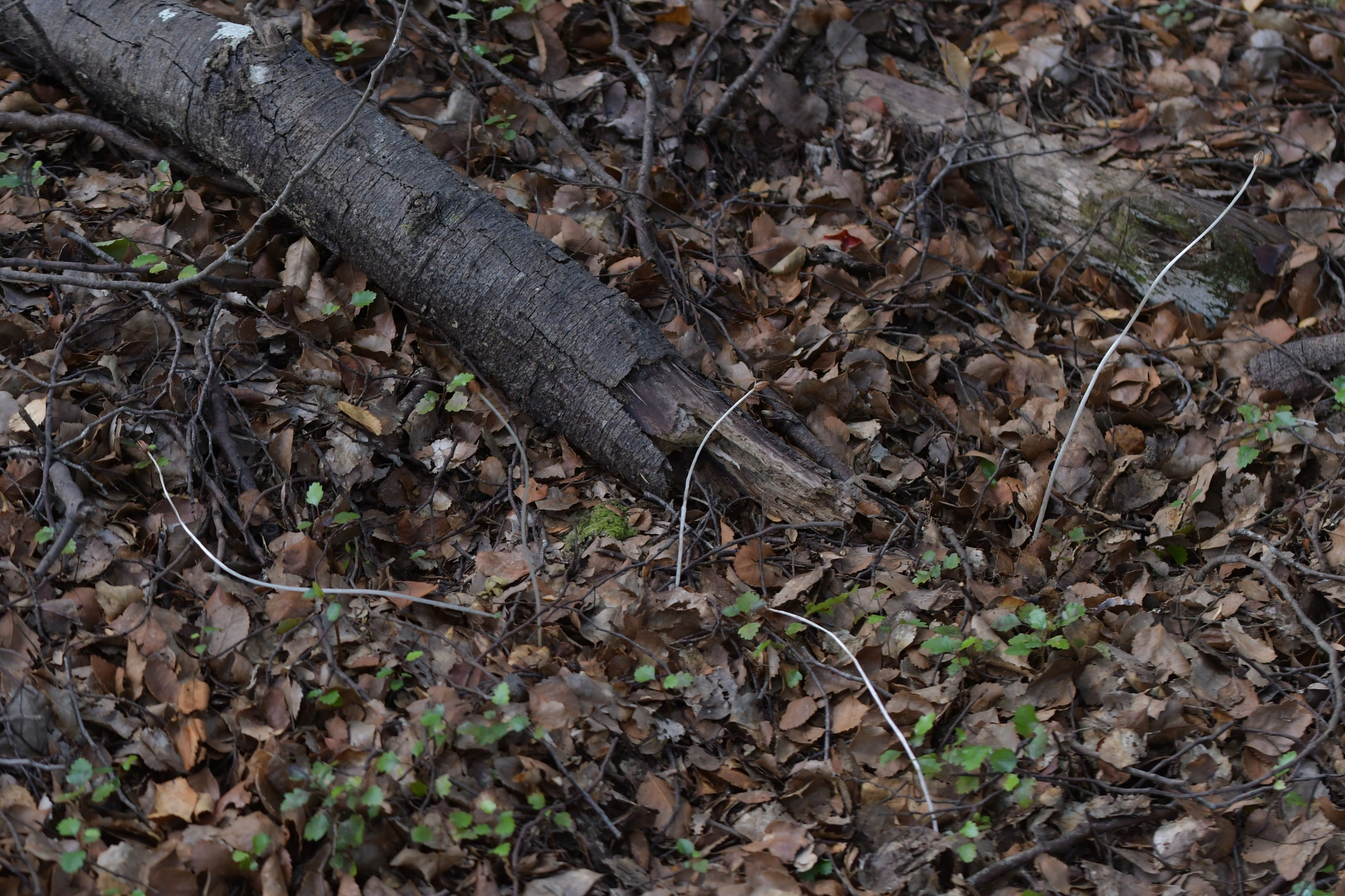
Fruiting capsules extending high above the leaf litter in beech forest

Corybas cryptanthus, commonly known as hidden spider orchid or icky, is a species of terrestrial orchid endemic to New Zealand. It has no obvious leaves and the mostly white flower is usually buried in leaf litter. The plant is usually only detected by its fruiting capsule which is borne on a stem which elongates up to 280 mm (10 in) high.

== Description ==
Corybas cryptanthus is a terrestrial, perennial, saprophytic, herb with its leaves reduced to tiny triangular scales on horizontal rhizoids buried in leaf litter. There is a single more or transparent whitish to pinkish flower with red or purple streaks. Its dorsal sepal is 10–14 mm (0.4–0.6 in) long and lance-shaped. The lateral sepals and petals are thread-like, the lateral sepals longer than the petals and often appear above the leaf litter. The labellum is up to 15 mm (0.6 in) long with its end covered with many branched lobes covered with tiny cilia. Flowering occurs from June to October following which the flowering stem elongates greatly, with the fruiting capsule on the end up to 280 mm (10 in) above the litter layer.

== Taxonomy ==
Edwin Hatch was the first to formally describe this species in 1951 but he gave it the name Corybas saprophyticus, unaware that the name had already been used for a different orchid. The name was therefore a nom. illeg. and in 1956 Hatch changed the name to Corybas cryptanthus. The original and the corrected descriptions were published in Transactions and Proceedings of the Royal Society of New Zealand. The specific epithet (cryptanthus) is derived from Ancient Greek words kryptos meaning "hidden" or "secret" and anthos meaning "flower".

== Distribution and habitat ==
Hidden spider orchid grows in dense shrubland and tall forest in partly decomposed leaf litter. It occurs on the North, South and Three Kings Islands.

== Ecology ==
It has been suggested that C. cryptanthus is partly a parasite on the roots of southern beech trees, obtaining nutrients via a fungus.
