= Corybas limpidus =

Crystal helmet orchid

Conservation status
- Priority Four — Rare Taxa (DEC)

Scientific classification
- Kingdom: Plantae
- Clade: Tracheophytes
- Clade: Angiosperms
- Clade: Monocots
- Order: Asparagales
- Family: Orchidaceae
- Subfamily: Orchidoideae
- Tribe: Diurideae
- Genus: Corybas
- Species: C. limpidus

Binomial name
- Corybas limpidus D.L.Jones & R.C.Nash

Synonyms
- Corysanthes limpida (D.L.Jones) D.L.Jones & M.A.Clem.

Species of orchid

Corybas limpidus, commonly known as the crystal helmet orchid, is a species of terrestrial orchid endemic to Western Australia. It has round or heart-shaped leaf and a translucent greenish flower with dark red or burgundy-coloured spots and blotches. The edges of the labellum have a few short, blunt teeth.

== Description ==
Corybas limpidus is a terrestrial, perennial, deciduous, herb with a single thin, round or broad heart-shaped leaf 20–35 mm (0.8–1 in) long and wide. The leaf is green on the upper surface and silvery green on the lower side. There is a single erect, translucent green flower with dark red spots and blotches, 10–15 mm (0.4–0.6 in) long and 7–10 mm (0.3–0.4 in) wide. The dorsal sepal is burgundy-coloured, 16–18 mm (0.6–0.7 in) long and 5–7 mm (0.2–0.3 in) wide and curves forward over the labellum. The lateral sepals are green, about 5 mm (0.2 in) long, 0.5 mm (0.02 in) wide, joined at their bases and taper to a fine tip. The petals are about 3 mm (0.1 in) long, 0.5 mm (0.02 in) wide and taper to a thread-like tip. The labellum is longer than the dorsal sepal, 8–11 mm (0.3–0.4 in) long, 7–9 mm (0.3–0.4 in) wide with a greenish mound in the centre. The edges of the labellum have a few short, blunt teeth. Flowering occurs in August and September.

== Taxonomy ==
Corybas limpidus was first formally described in 1991 by David Jones, in Australian Orchid Research, based on specimens collected near Albany in 1986. The specific epithet (limpidus) is a Latin word meaning "clear", "transparent" or "pure", referring to the dorsal sepal and part of the labellum.

In 2002, David Jones and Mark Clements proposed splitting Corybas into smaller genera and placing this species into Corysanthes but the change has not been widely accepted.

== Distribution and habitat ==
The crystal helmet orchid grows under dense shrubs between sand dunes in coastal areas from Esperance to Walpole in the Esperance Plains, Jarrah Forest and Warren biogeographic regions.

== Conservation ==
Corybas limpidus is classified as "Priority Four" by the Government of Western Australia Department of Parks and Wildlife, meaning that is rare or near threatened.
