= Corybas cerasinus =

Red helmet orchid

Scientific classification
- Kingdom: Plantae
- Clade: Tracheophytes
- Clade: Angiosperms
- Clade: Monocots
- Order: Asparagales
- Family: Orchidaceae
- Subfamily: Orchidoideae
- Tribe: Diurideae
- Genus: Corybas
- Species: C. cerasinus

Binomial name
- Corybas cerasinus D.L.Jones & B.Gray

Species of orchid

Corybas cerasinus, commonly known as the red helmet orchid, is a species of terrestrial orchid endemic to tropical north Queensland. It has a single bluish green, heart-shaped leaf and a cherry red to dark maroon flower with its curved dorsal sepal obscuring its labellum which has an upturned tip.

== Description ==
Corybas cerasinus is a terrestrial, perennial, deciduous, herb with a single heart-shaped leaf 12–25 mm (0.5–1 in) long and 10–14 mm (0.4–0.6 in) wide, lying flat on the ground. The leaf is bluish green on the upper surface and purplish on the lower side. There is a single erect, cherry red to dark maroon flower 9–13 mm (0.4–0.5 in) long and 5–9 mm (0.2–0.4 in) wide. The largest part of the flower is the dorsal sepal which is egg-shaped to oblong when flattened, 15–23 mm (0.6–0.9 in) long and 6–10 mm (0.2–0.4 in) wide. The lateral sepals are linear, about 1.5 mm (0.06 in) long and the petals are about 1 mm (0.04 in) long. The labellum is mostly hidden by the dorsal sepal but has edges which turn upwards and a few tiny bristles. Flowering occurs from June to August.

== Taxonomy ==
Corybas cerasinus was first formally described in 2001 by David Jones and Bruce Gray from a specimen collected on Mount Walker and the description was published in The Orchadian. The specific epithet (cerasinus) is a Latin word meaning "cherry-coloured".

== Distribution and habitat ==
The red helmet orchid grows in forest in colonies with often only a few plants in flower. It is found between Cooktown and the Herbert River and also on Dunk Island.
