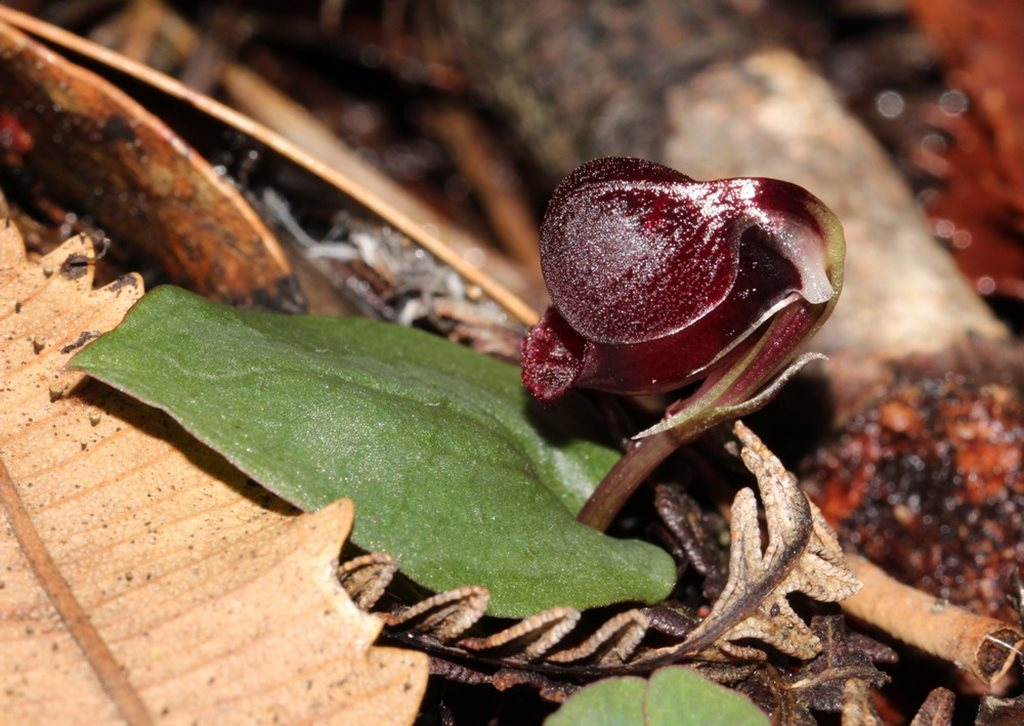
- Corybas unguiculatus on Wilsons Promontory

Scientific classification
- Kingdom: Plantae
- Clade: Tracheophytes
- Clade: Angiosperms
- Clade: Monocots
- Order: Asparagales
- Family: Orchidaceae
- Subfamily: Orchidoideae
- Tribe: Diurideae
- Genus: Corybas
- Species: C. unguiculatus

Binomial name
- Corybas unguiculatus (R.Br.) Rchb.f.

Synonyms
- Corysanthes unguiculata R.Br.; Anzybas unguiculata (R.Br.) D.L.Jones & M.A.Clem.

= Corybas unguiculatus =

Small helmet orchid

Species of orchid

Corybas unguiculatus, commonly known as the small helmet orchid or pelicans, is a species of terrestrial orchid endemic to south-eastern Australia. It is a widespread, sometimes common but small orchid with a single leaf and a single reddish purple to reddish black flower.

== Description ==
Corybas unguiculatus is a terrestrial, perennial, deciduous, herb with a single egg-shaped, heart-shaped or round leaf 5–30 mm (0.2–1 in) long and 10–20 mm (0.4–0.8 in) wide. The leaf is greyish green on the upper surface and reddish on the lower side. There is a single reddish purple to reddish black flower which leans downward almost touching the ovary and 12–15 mm (0.5–0.6 in) long. The flower stem is 10–20 mm (0.4–0.8 in) long with a bract about 5 mm (0.2 in) long just below the ovary. The dorsal sepal is spoon-shaped and bulbous, 13–16 mm (0.5–0.6 in) long, 10–12 mm (0.4–0.5 in) wide and smaller than the labellum. The lateral sepals are white, narrow linear, 5–10 mm (0.2–0.4 in) long and the petals are similar but only half as long. The labellum is about 15 mm (0.6 in) long, entirely purple and tube-shaped with the opening pointing downwards and forwards and about 6 mm (0.2 in) wide. There are a few small teeth on the edge of the labellum. Flowering occurs from May to August.

== Taxonomy ==
The small helmet orchid was first formally described in 1810 by Robert Brown, who gave it the name Corysanthes unguiculata and published the description in his book Prodromus Florae Novae Hollandiae et Insulae Van Diemen. In 1871 Heinrich Gustav Reichenbach changed the name to Corybas unguiculatus. The specific epithet (unguiculatus) is a Latin word meaning "hooved".

== Distribution and habitat ==
Corybas unguiculatus is a widespread, sometimes common species which grows in heath and heathy forest. It occurs in New South Wales south from Gosford, in southern Victoria, in the far south-east of South Australia and in Tasmania.

== Conservation ==
Although sometimes common in other states, C. unguiculatus is listed as "rare" in South Australia. The main threats to the species in that state are habitat loss, grazing by slugs and snails and weed invasion.
