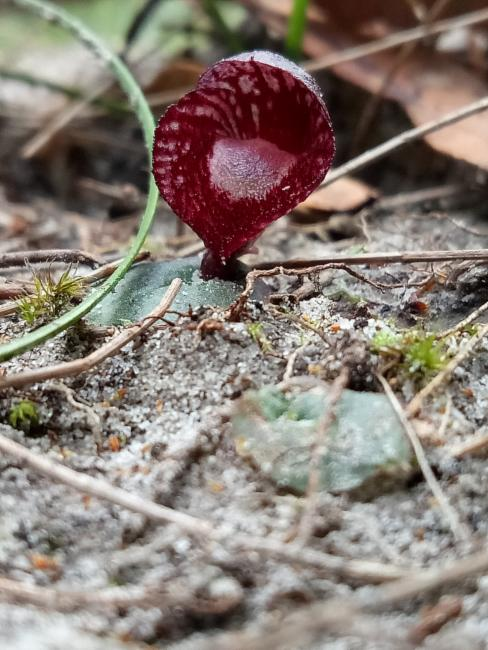
- Near Sussex Inlet

Scientific classification
- Kingdom: Plantae
- Clade: Tracheophytes
- Clade: Angiosperms
- Clade: Monocots
- Order: Asparagales
- Family: Orchidaceae
- Subfamily: Orchidoideae
- Tribe: Diurideae
- Genus: Corybas
- Species: C. undulatus

Binomial name
- Corybas undulatus (R.Cunn.) Rupp

Synonyms
- Corybas undulatus Rupp nom. inval., nom. prov.; Corysanthes undulata R.Cunn.

= Corybas undulatus =

Tailed helmet orchid

Species of orchid

Corybas undulatus, commonly known as tailed helmet orchid, is a species of terrestrial orchid endemic to eastern Australia. It has a single leaf and a single translucent grey flower with reddish markings, and a labellum with a bristly surface, fine teeth on the edge and a small tail on the tip.

== Description ==
Corybas undulatus is a terrestrial, perennial, deciduous, herb with a single leaf 10–20 mm (0.4–0.8 in) long and 8–18 mm (0.3–0.7 in) wide. The leaf is greyish green on the upper surface and silvery green or reddish on the lower side. There is a single translucent grey flower with purplish red and white markings, 10–13 mm (0.4–0.5 in) long and 9–12 mm (0.4–0.5 in) wide which leans backwards. The dorsal sepal is spatula-shaped to egg-shaped with the narrower end towards the base, 12–14 mm (0.5–0.6 in) long and 6–8 mm (0.2–0.3 in) wide. The lateral sepals are thread-like, about 3.5 mm (0.1 in) long and 0.5 mm (0.02 in) long and the petals are similar but shorter. The labellum is tube shaped at its base and for about half its length before opening into a broad heart-shaped dish 9–12 mm (0.4–0.5 in) long and wide. This part of the labellum has a whitish centre and is covered with tiny bristles. The edges of the labellum have tiny teeth and there is a small tail-like tip on the lower edge. Flowering occurs from May to July.

== Taxonomy ==
Tailed helmet orchid was first formally described in 1833 by Richard Cunningham, who gave it the name Corysanthes undulata and published the description in the New South Wales Magazine. In 1942 Herman Rupp changed the name to Corybas undulatus. The specific epithet (undulatus) is a Latin word meaning "wavy".

== Distribution and habitat ==
Corybas undulatus is an uncommon, often overlook species growing in grassy and heathy forest in coastal areas of Queensland south from Bundaberg to Jervis Bay in New South Wales.
