= Corybas montanus =

Montane helmet orchid

Conservation status
- Vulnerable (EPBC Act)

Scientific classification
- Kingdom: Plantae
- Clade: Tracheophytes
- Clade: Angiosperms
- Clade: Monocots
- Order: Asparagales
- Family: Orchidaceae
- Subfamily: Orchidoideae
- Tribe: Diurideae
- Genus: Corybas
- Species: C. montanus

Binomial name
- Corybas montanus D.L.Jones

Synonyms
- Anzybas montanus (D.L.Jones) D.L.Jones & M.A.Clem.

Species of orchid

Corybas montanus, commonly known as the montane helmet orchid, is a species of terrestrial orchid endemic to Queensland. It forms small colonies and has single heart-shaped to round leaf and a reddish, self-pollinating flower with a curved dorsal sepal. It is only known from the Mount Barney National Park in south-east Queensland.

== Description ==
Corybas montanus is a terrestrial, perennial, deciduous, herb with a single heart-shaped to almost round leaf 22–38 mm (0.9–1 in) long and 17–30 mm (0.7–1 in) wide. The leaf is bluish green with whitish veins on the upper surface and shiny greenish purple on the lower side. The flower is reddish to reddish purple, 12–14 mm (0.5–0.6 in) long and leans downwards. The dorsal sepal is 11–12.5 mm (0.4–0.5 in) long and 4.5–6 mm (0.18–0.24 in) wide and curved, expanding to a dished egg-shape. The lateral sepals and petals linear, about 5 mm (0.2 in) long, 0.5 mm (0.02 in) wide and curve around the side of the labellum. The labellum is reddish, forms a tube 13–14 mm (0.5–0.6 in) long, about 15 mm (0.6 in) wide with glistening dark red calli along its centre. Flowering occurs in June and July.

== Taxonomy ==
Corybas montanus was first formally described in 1988 by D.L.Jones and the description was published in Austrobaileya from a specimen collected on Mount Maroon. The specific epithet (montanus) is a Latin word meaning "of mountains", referring to the habitat of this species.

== Distribution and habitat ==
The montane helmet orchid is self-pollinating and grows on slopes in open forest on Mount Maroon.

== Conservation ==
Corybas montanus is classified as "vulnerable" under the Australian Government Environment Protection and Biodiversity Conservation Act 1999. The main potential threat to the species is illegal collection.
