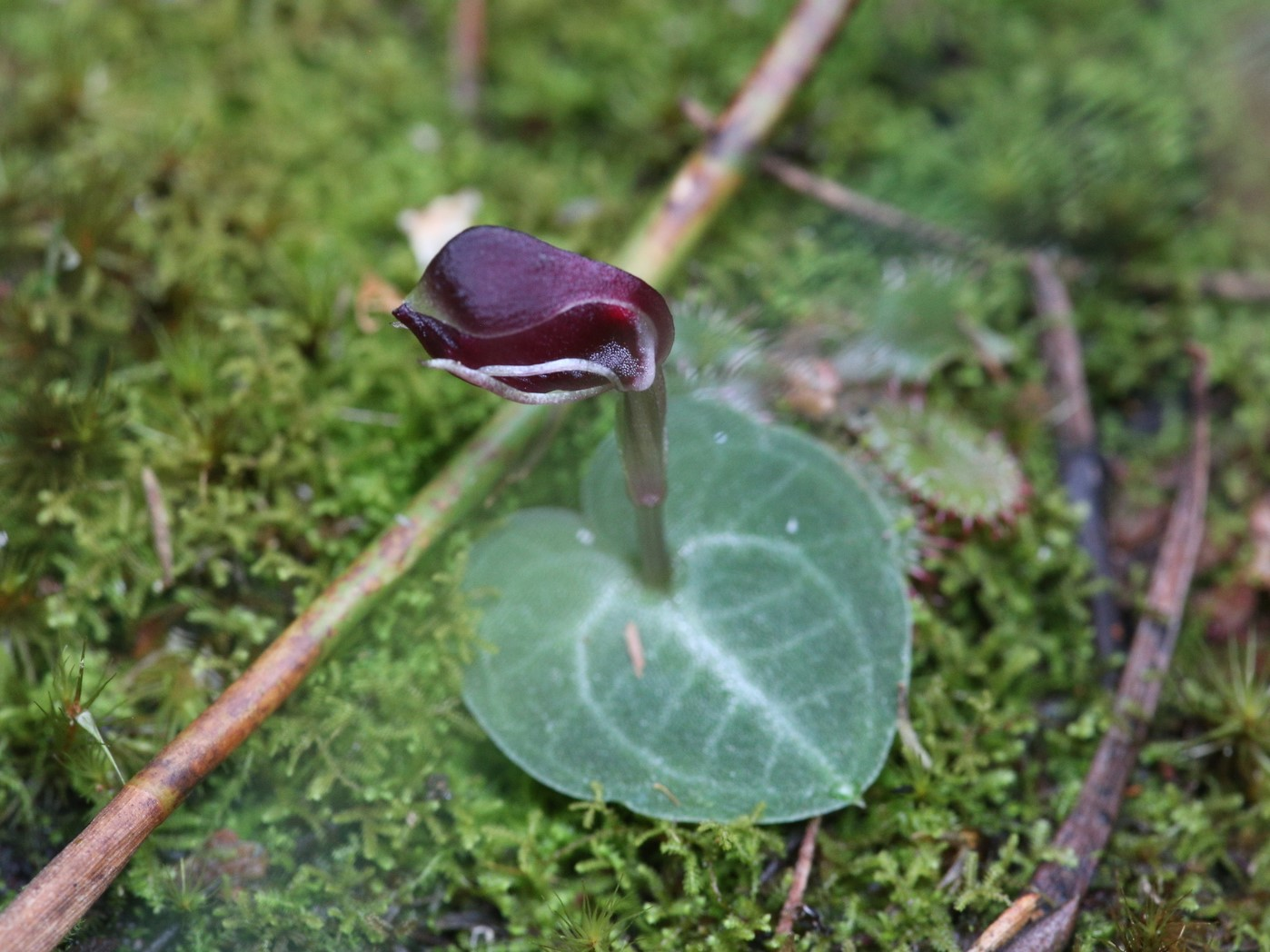

Conservation status
- Priority Three — Poorly Known Taxa (DEC)

Scientific classification
- Kingdom: Plantae
- Clade: Tracheophytes
- Clade: Angiosperms
- Clade: Monocots
- Order: Asparagales
- Family: Orchidaceae
- Subfamily: Orchidoideae
- Tribe: Diurideae
- Genus: Corybas
- Species: C. abditus

Binomial name
- Corybas abditus D.L.Jones

Synonyms
- Anzybas abditus (D.L.Jones) D.L.Jones & M.A.Clem.

= Corybas abditus =

Swamp helmet orchid

Species of orchid

Corybas abditus, commonly known as the swamp helmet orchid or small helmet orchid, is a species of terrestrial orchid endemic to Western Australia. It is a rare orchid with a single bluish green, heart-shaped leaf and a small flower with an enlarged dorsal sepal and tube-shaped labellum.

== Description ==
Corybas abditus is a terrestrial, perennial, deciduous, herb with a single heart-shaped or egg-shaped leaf 6–20 mm (0.2–0.8 in) long and 7–20 mm (0.3–0.8 in) wide. The leaf is bluish green with three whitish veins on the upper surface and purplish on the lower side. A single reddish purple flower 9–11 mm (0.35–0.43 in) long is borne on a stalk about 6 mm (0.2 in) high. The largest part of the flower is the dorsal sepal which is 9–11 mm (0.35–0.43 in) long and 5–6 mm (0.20–0.24 in) wide. The lateral sepals are white, linear, about 8 mm (0.3 in) long, 0.5 mm (0.02 in) wide and held horizontally below the labellum. The petals are white, linear, about 6 mm (0.24 in) long, 0.5 mm (0.02 in) wide and curve around the labellum. The labellum is tube-shaped, reddish, 10–11 mm (0.39–0.43 in) long, 4–12 mm (0.2–0.5 in) wide and has three lobes, the middle one projecting under the dorsal sepal. Flowering occurs from September to November.

== Taxonomy ==
Corybas abditus was first formally described in 1991 by David Jones from a specimen collected near Bakers Junction north of Albany and the description was published in Australian Orchid Research. The specific epithet (abditus) is a Latin word meaning "hidden" or "concealed", referring to the cryptic nature of this orchid and it dense habitat.

In 2002, David Jones and Mark Clements proposed splitting Corybas into smaller genera and placing this species into Anzybas but the change has not been widely accepted.

== Distribution and habitat ==
The swamp helmet orchid grows in dense vegetation on small mounds in dense winter-wet swamps. It occurs in disjunct populations between Nannup and Esperance.

== Conservation ==
Corybas abditus is classified as "Priority Three" by the Government of Western Australia Department of Parks and Wildlife meaning that it is poorly known and known from only a few locations but is not under imminent threat.
