= Corybas dentatus =

Lofty Ranges helmet orchid

Conservation status
- Vulnerable (EPBC Act)

Scientific classification
- Kingdom: Plantae
- Clade: Tracheophytes
- Clade: Angiosperms
- Clade: Monocots
- Order: Asparagales
- Family: Orchidaceae
- Subfamily: Orchidoideae
- Tribe: Diurideae
- Genus: Corybas
- Species: C. dentatus

Binomial name
- Corybas dentatus D.L.Jones

Synonyms
- Corysanthes dentata (D.L.Jones) D.L.Jones & M.A.Clem.

Species of orchid

Corybas dentatus, commonly known as the Lofty Ranges helmet orchid, is a species of terrestrial orchid endemic to South Australia. It has a more or less round leaf and a single purplish and green flower. It is only known from two locations and is listed as "vulnerable" under the Environment Protection and Biodiversity Conservation Act.

== Description ==
Corybas dentatus is a terrestrial, perennial, deciduous, herb with a broad egg-shaped, heart-shaped or almost round leaf 25–45 mm (1–2 in) long and 30–42 mm (1–2 in) wide. The leaf is green on the upper surface and silvery green on the lower side. A single purplish and green flower 18–25 mm (0.7–1 in) long and 12–13 mm (0.47–0.51 in) wide is borne on a short flowering stem. The largest part of the flower is the dorsal sepal which is 20–22 mm (0.79–0.87 in) long and 9–11 mm (0.35–0.43 in) wide. It is pinkish grey with dark purple markings and forms a hood over the labellum. The lateral sepals are whitish, linear to lance-shaped, about 5 mm (0.2 in) long, and 1 mm (0.04 in) wide and spread widely apart from each other. The petals are lance-shaped, about 3 mm (0.12 in) long, 1 mm (0.04 in) wide and curved. The labellum is dark purple, tube-shaped near its base, about 6 mm (0.2 in) long, before curving and flattening into a broad egg-shaped flat 12–13 mm (0.47–0.51 in) long and wide with teeth on the edges. Flowering occurs in July and August.

== Taxonomy ==
Corybas dentatus was first formally described in 1991 by David Jones from a specimen collected in the Sandy Crrek Conservation Park and the description was published in Australian Orchid Research. The specific epithet (dentatus) is a Latin word meaning "toothed" or "pointed", referring to the prominent teeth on the edges of the labellum.

In 2002, David Jones and Mark Clements proposed splitting Corybas into smaller genera and placing this species into Corysanthes but the change has not been widely accepted.

== Distribution and habitat ==
The Lofty Ranges helmet orchid grows in open forest and woodland with low shrubs and ferns. It is known from two populations, the larger of which is in the Sandy Creek Conservation Park.

== Conservation ==
Corybas dentatus is classified as "vulnerable" under the Australian Government Environment Protection and Biodiversity Conservation Act 1999. The main threats to the species are road and track maintenance, weed invasion, herbicide spraying and population fragmentation.
