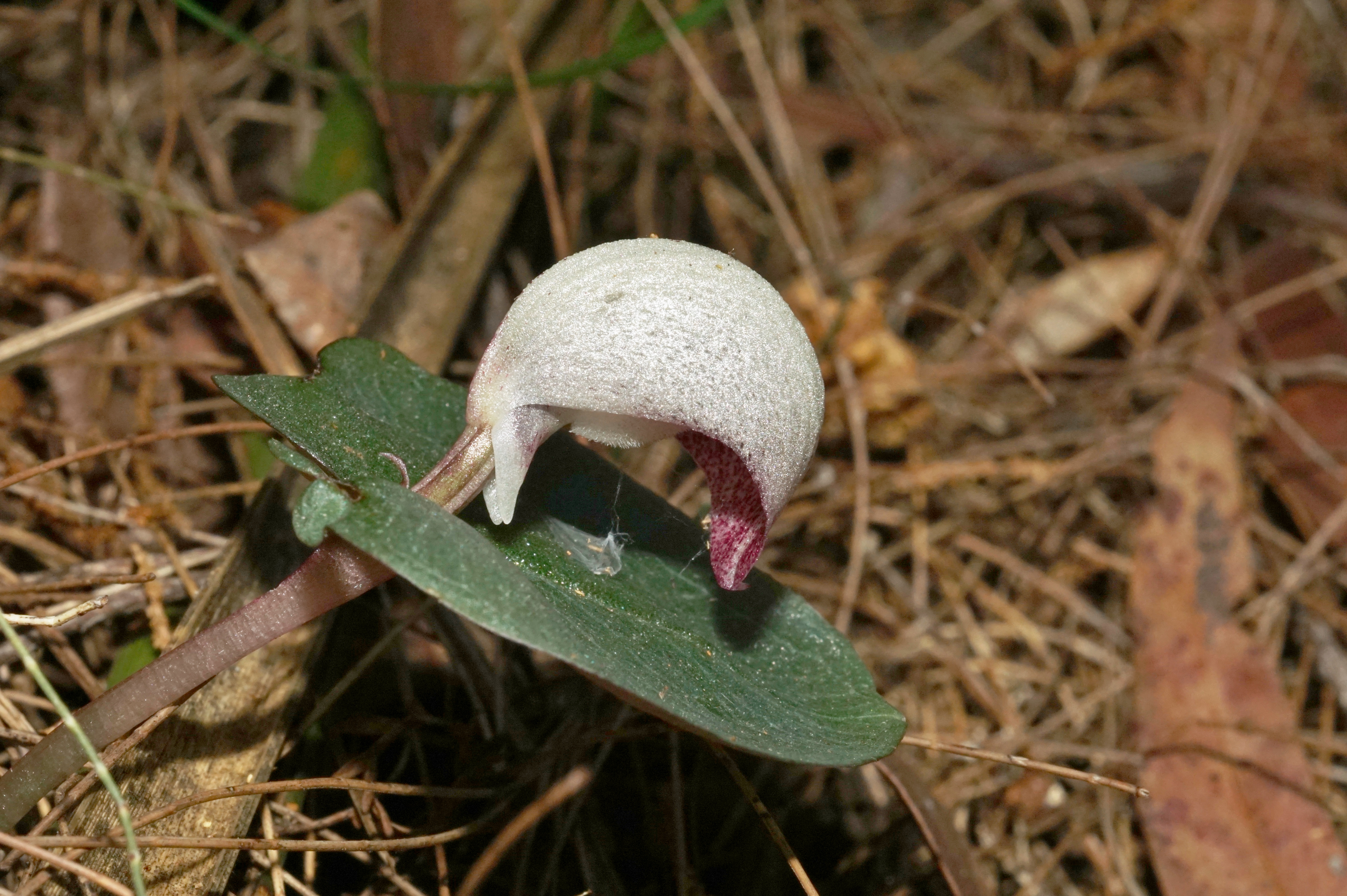
- Near Gosford

Scientific classification
- Kingdom: Plantae
- Clade: Tracheophytes
- Clade: Angiosperms
- Clade: Monocots
- Order: Asparagales
- Family: Orchidaceae
- Subfamily: Orchidoideae
- Tribe: Diurideae
- Genus: Corybas
- Species: C. barbarae

Binomial name
- Corybas barbarae D.L.Jones

= Corybas barbarae =

Fairy lanterns

Species of orchid

Corybas barbarae, commonly known as fairy lanterns, is a species of terrestrial orchid endemic to eastern Australia including Lord Howe Island. It has a single dark green or reddish green, heart-shaped leaf and a small sparkling white or pinkish flower with an inflated dorsal sepal obscuring its hairy labellum.

== Description ==
Corybas barbarae is a terrestrial, perennial, deciduous, herb with a single heart-shaped to almost round leaf 16–32 mm (0.6–1 in) long and 18–36 mm (0.7–1 in) wide. The leaf is dark green or reddish green on the upper surface and silvery green to light reddish purple on the lower side. There is a single sparkling white or pinkish flower 30–35 mm (1.2–1.4 in) long and 15–20 mm (0.6–0.8 in) wide which leans downwards. The largest part of the flower is the dorsal sepal which is curved and inflated, 27–32 mm (1–1 in) long and 15–20 mm (0.6–0.8 in) wide. The lateral sepals are linear, about 2 mm (0.08 in) long, and turn upwards towards the base of the labellum. The petals are about 1 mm (0.04 in) long and hidden by the labellum. The labellum is mostly hidden by the dorsal sepal, tube shaped near its base, about 12.5 mm (0.5 in) long, 7 mm (0.3 in) wide, translucent white and hairy. Flowering occurs from March to July.

== Taxonomy ==
Corybas barbarae was first formally described in 1988 by David Jones from a specimen collected on Tamborine Mountain and the description was published in Austrobaileya. The specific epithet (barbarae) honours Barbara Elizabeth Jones, the wife of the author.

== Distribution and habitat ==
Fairy lanterns is widespread and common, growing in protected areas in forest and woodland from the Atherton Tableland in Queensland to the northern suburbs of Sydney in New South Wales. It also occurs on Lord Howe Island.
