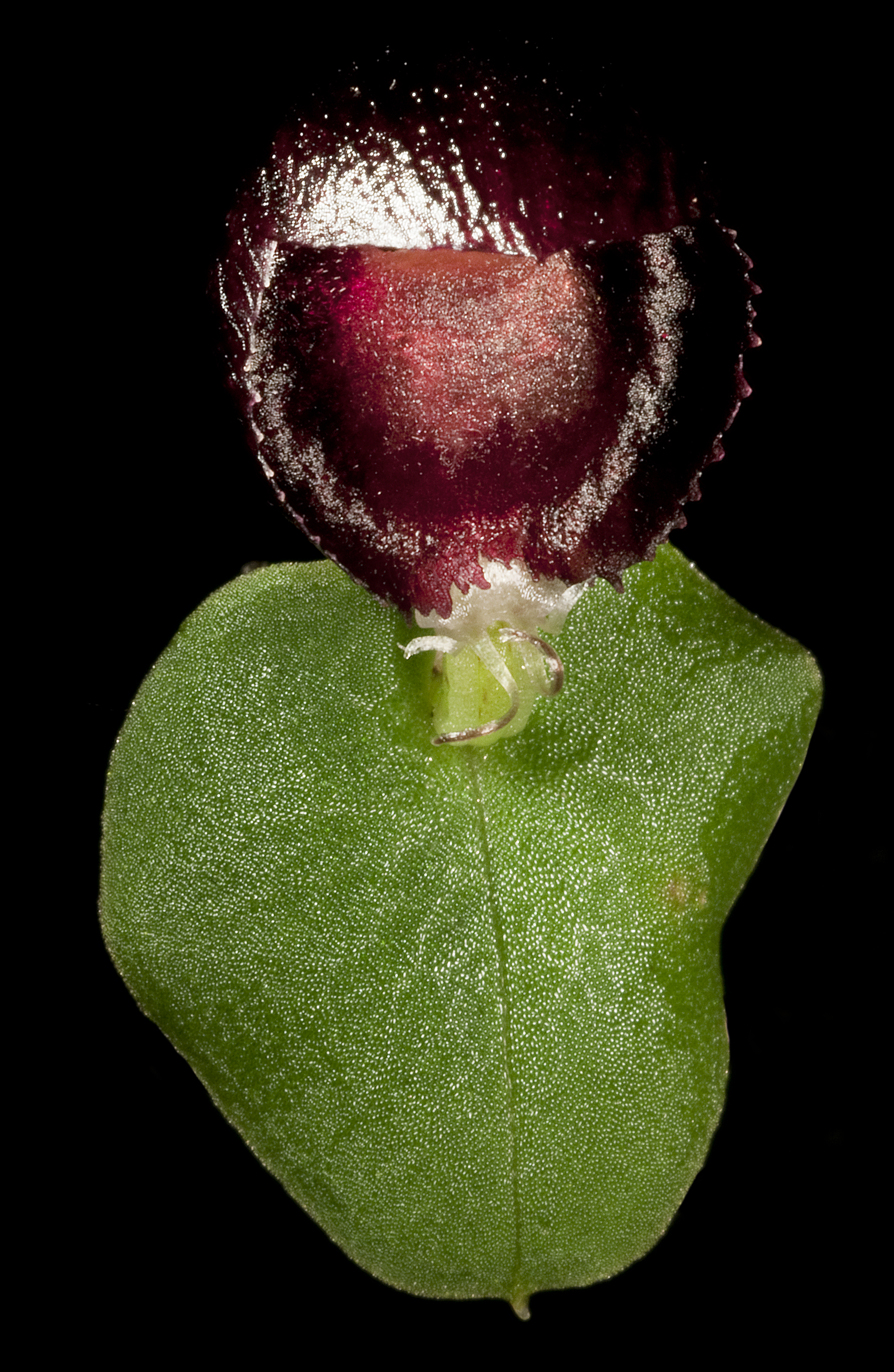

Scientific classification
- Kingdom: Plantae
- Clade: Tracheophytes
- Clade: Angiosperms
- Clade: Monocots
- Order: Asparagales
- Family: Orchidaceae
- Subfamily: Orchidoideae
- Tribe: Diurideae
- Genus: Corybas
- Species: C. recurvus

Binomial name
- Corybas recurvus D.L.Jones

Synonyms
- Corysanthes recurva (D.L.Jones) D.L.Jones & M.A.Clem.

= Corybas recurvus =

Western helmet orchid

Species of orchid

Corybas recurvus, commonly known as western helmet orchid or common helmet is a species of terrestrial orchid endemic to Western Australia. It has round or heart-shaped leaf and a dark reddish purple or purplish black flower. It is widespread and common between Bunbury and Albany.

== Description ==
Corybas recurvus is a terrestrial, perennial, deciduous, herb with a single thin, round or broad heart-shaped leaf 15–40 mm (0.6–2 in) long and 15–45 mm (0.6–2 in) wide. The leaf is green on the upper surface and silvery green on the lower side. There is a single dark reddish purple or purplish black flower 15–20 mm (0.6–0.8 in) long and 8–12 mm (0.3–0.5 in) wide which leans backwards. The dorsal sepal is 23–34 mm (0.9–1 in) long, 12–20 mm (0.5–0.8 in) wide and curves forward over the labellum. The lateral sepals are whitish, about 5 mm (0.2 in) long, 0.5 mm (0.02 in) wide, joined at their bases and projected forwards. The petals also whitish, about 3 mm (0.1 in) long, 0.5 mm (0.02 in) wide and taper to a thread-like tip. The labellum is tube-shaped at the base, the tube 6–7.5 mm (0.2–0.3 in) long, before opening to a dish-shape 14–20 mm (0.6–0.8 in) long, 9–11 mm (0.35–0.43 in) wide, dark reddish purple or purplish black with many broad, blunt teeth around the edge. Flowering occurs from July to September.

== Taxonomy ==
Corybas recurvus was first formally described in 1991 by David Jones from a specimen collected near Toolbrunup and the description was published in Australian Orchid Research. The specific epithet (recurvus) is a Latin word meaning "recurved" or "curved backwards ", referring to the flower of this orchid.

In 2002, David Jones and Mark Clements proposed splitting Corybas into smaller genera and placing this species into Corysanthes but the change has not been widely accepted.

== Distribution and habitat ==
Western helmet orchid is widespread and common between Bunbury and Albany, growing in moist forests. It sometimes grows in large colonies in dense coastal scrub and in plantations of introduced pine.

== Conservation ==
Corybas recurvus is classified as "not threatened" by the Government of Western Australia Department of Parks and Wildlife.
