= Corybas abellianus =

Nodding helmet orchid

Scientific classification
- Kingdom: Plantae
- Clade: Tracheophytes
- Clade: Angiosperms
- Clade: Monocots
- Order: Asparagales
- Family: Orchidaceae
- Subfamily: Orchidoideae
- Tribe: Diurideae
- Genus: Corybas
- Species: C. abellianus

Binomial name
- Corybas abellianus Dockrill

Species of orchid

Corybas abellianus, commonly known as the nodding helmet orchid, is a species of terrestrial orchid endemic to tropical north Queensland. It forms small colonies and has single heart-shaped, dark green leaf with a silvery white lower side and a reddish purple flower with a curved dorsal sepal.

== Description ==
Corybas abellianus is a terrestrial, perennial, deciduous, herb with a single heart-shaped to almost round leaf 10–20 mm (0.4–0.8 in) long and 5–10 mm (0.2–0.4 in) wide. The leaf is dark green with silvery white veins on the upper surface and reddish on the lower side. The reddish purple flower is 8–10 mm (0.3–0.4 in) long and 5–6 mm (0.20–0.24 in) wide and leans downwards. The largest part of the flower is the dorsal sepal which is 12–15 mm (0.5–0.6 in) long and 6–8 mm (0.2–0.3 in) wide. The lateral sepals are narrow triangular, about 1 mm (0.04 in) long and turn downwards. The petals are less than 1 mm (0.04 in) long. The labellum is much shorter than the dorsal sepal, smooth and has a whitish tip. Flowering occurs from February to May.

== Taxonomy ==
Corybas abellianus was first formally described in 1955 by Alick Dockrill and the description was published in The North Queensland Naturalist.

== Distribution and habitat ==
The nodding helmet orchid grows in small groups in rainforest on the higher parts of the Atherton Tableland and as far south as Tully Falls near Ravenshoe.
