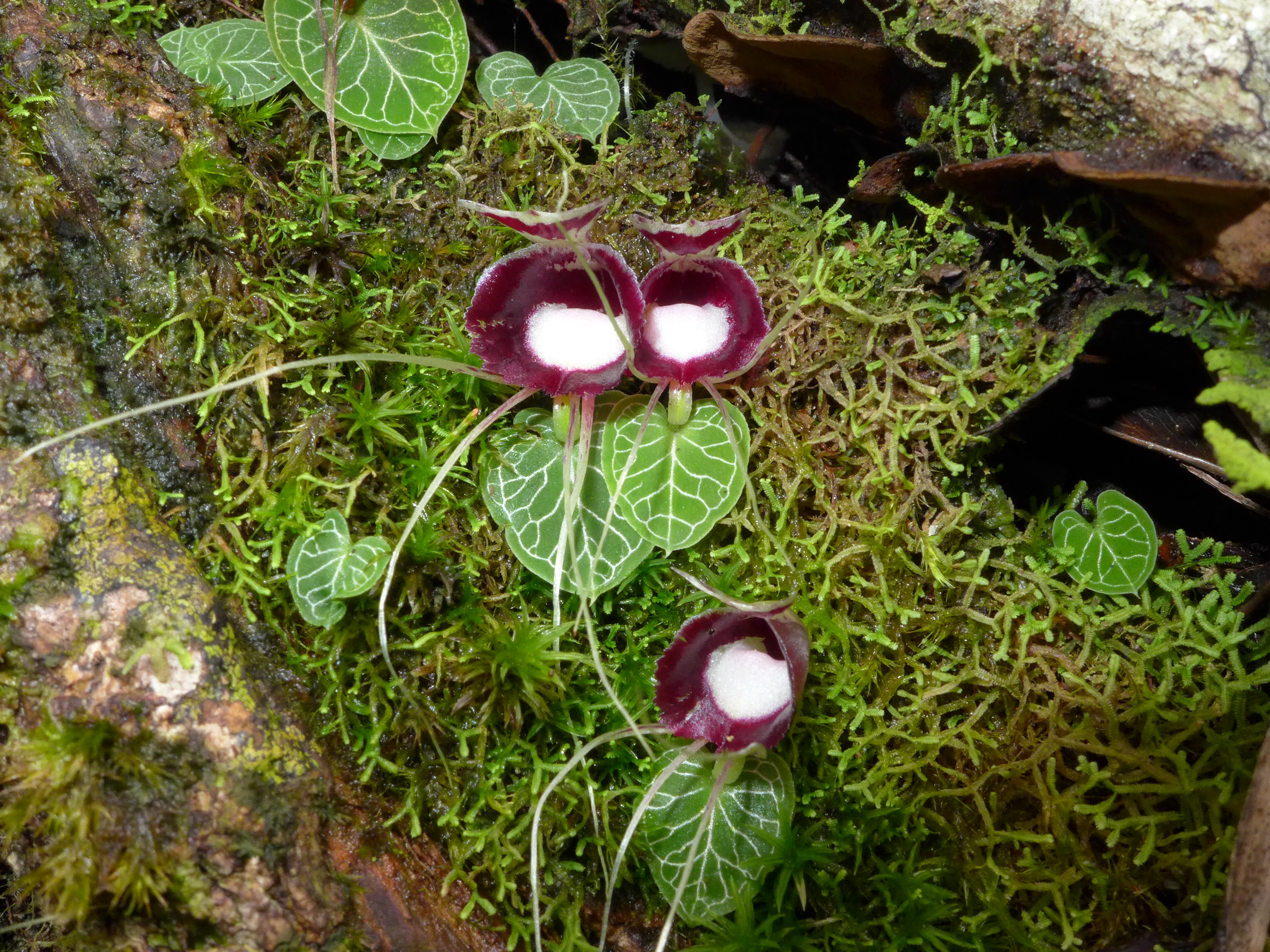
- Corybas pictus - a South-East Asian species

Scientific classification
- Kingdom: Plantae
- Clade: Tracheophytes
- Clade: Angiosperms
- Clade: Monocots
- Order: Asparagales
- Family: Orchidaceae
- Subfamily: Orchidoideae
- Tribe: Diurideae
- Subtribe: Acianthinae
- Genus: Corybas; Salisb.
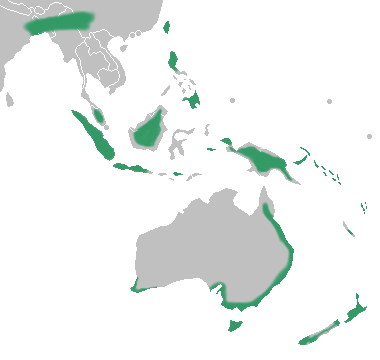
- Corybas range map

Synonyms
- Corysanthes R.Br.; Calcearia Blume; Nematoceras Hook.f.; Anzybas D.L.Jones & M.A.Clem.; Gastrosiphon (Schltr.) M.A.Clem. & D.L.Jones; Molloybas D.L.Jones & M.A.Clem.; Singularybas Molloy, D.L.Jones & M.A.Clem.

= Corybas (plant) =

Helmet orchids

Genus of orchids

Corybas, commonly known as helmet orchids, is a genus of about 120 species of plants in the orchid family, Orchidaceae. Helmet orchids are small, perennial, deciduous herbs and are nearly always terrestrial. They have a single leaf at their base and a single flower on a short stalk, the flower dominated by its large dorsal sepal and labellum. Species of Corybas are found in Australia, New Zealand, New Guinea, Southeast Asia, the Himalayas, southern China, many Pacific islands and a few sub-Antarctic islands.

== Description ==
Orchids in the genus Corybas are perennial, deciduous, sympodial, usually terrestrial herbs, lacking roots. (A few sometimes grow as epiphytes on the fibrous bark of tree ferns or on the mossy branches of trees.) They have an underground tuber which is more or less spherical and fleshy. New tubers form at the end of root-like stolons. There is a single, heart-shaped, kidney-shaped or almost round leaf, usually at ground level and a short erect stem with a single flower at the top.

The flower has a short stalk with a small, leaf-like bract at its base. The flower is resupinate, dull-coloured and resembles the fruiting body of a fungus. The dorsal sepal is much larger than the lateral sepals and petals and curves forward, often forming a hood over the column. The lateral sepals and petals are small, linear to almost thread-like. As is usual in orchids, one petal is highly modified as the central labellum and in this genus is often the most obvious part of the flower. The labellum is large, deeply concave or tube-shaped with its base attached to the base of the column and sometimes completely surrounding the column. Sometimes there is a pair of small, ear-like appendages on either side, near the base. The column is small, enclosed by the base of the labellum and has small wings. In temperate regions, flowering occurs between autumn and spring and in tropical regions in most months. The fruit that follows flowering is a non-fleshy, dehiscent capsule containing up to 500 seeds. As the fruit matures, the flower withers and the flower stem elongates to a length of up to 30 cm (12 in), aiding in seed dispersal.

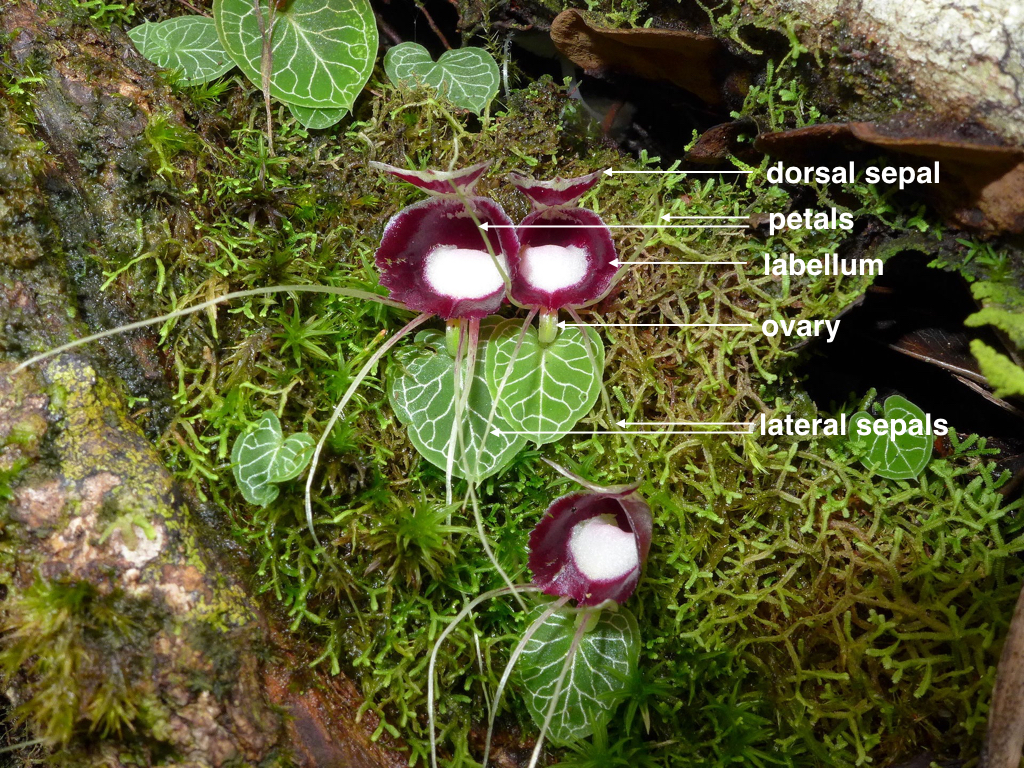
Labelled image (Corybas pictus)

== Taxonomy and naming ==
Corybas aconitiflorus was first formally described by Richard Salisbury, allegedly from a colour plate prepared by Ferdinand Bauer and thus became the type species for the genus. The description was published in The Paradisus Londinensis. Salisbury stated that the name of the genus was derived from similarity of the flowers to the covered head of the Greek Κορύβας (Korybas), a male dancer, shown in illustrations wearing a crested helmet, who worshipped the goddess Cybele. Korybas was a priest of Cybele, "whose religious rites were accompanied by frenzied music and dancing". A 2002 revision of Corybas split it into numerous genera, but this is not widely accepted.

== Ecology ==
Pollination appears to be achieved by small insects, possibly mistaking the unusual flowers for fungi. Helmet orchids have not often been studied, partly because of their short-lived, inconspicuous flowers but also because the flowers are difficult to preserve as herbarium specimens. Many form clonal colonies but it is not known whether this is a characteristic of all species.

== Distribution and habitat ==
Helmet orchids grow in India, South China, Taiwan, the Malay Peninsula, Borneo, the Philippines, New Caledonia, Vanuatu, Ponape, Indonesia, New Guinea, the Solomon Islands, Australia (including Macquarie Island), New Zealand (including Chatham, Stewart, Auckland and Campbell Islands), Tahiti, Samoa and the Society Islands. Australian species usually grow in moist, shady places, often with dense moss or on rotting logs, sometimes with orchids from other genera.

=== Gallery ===
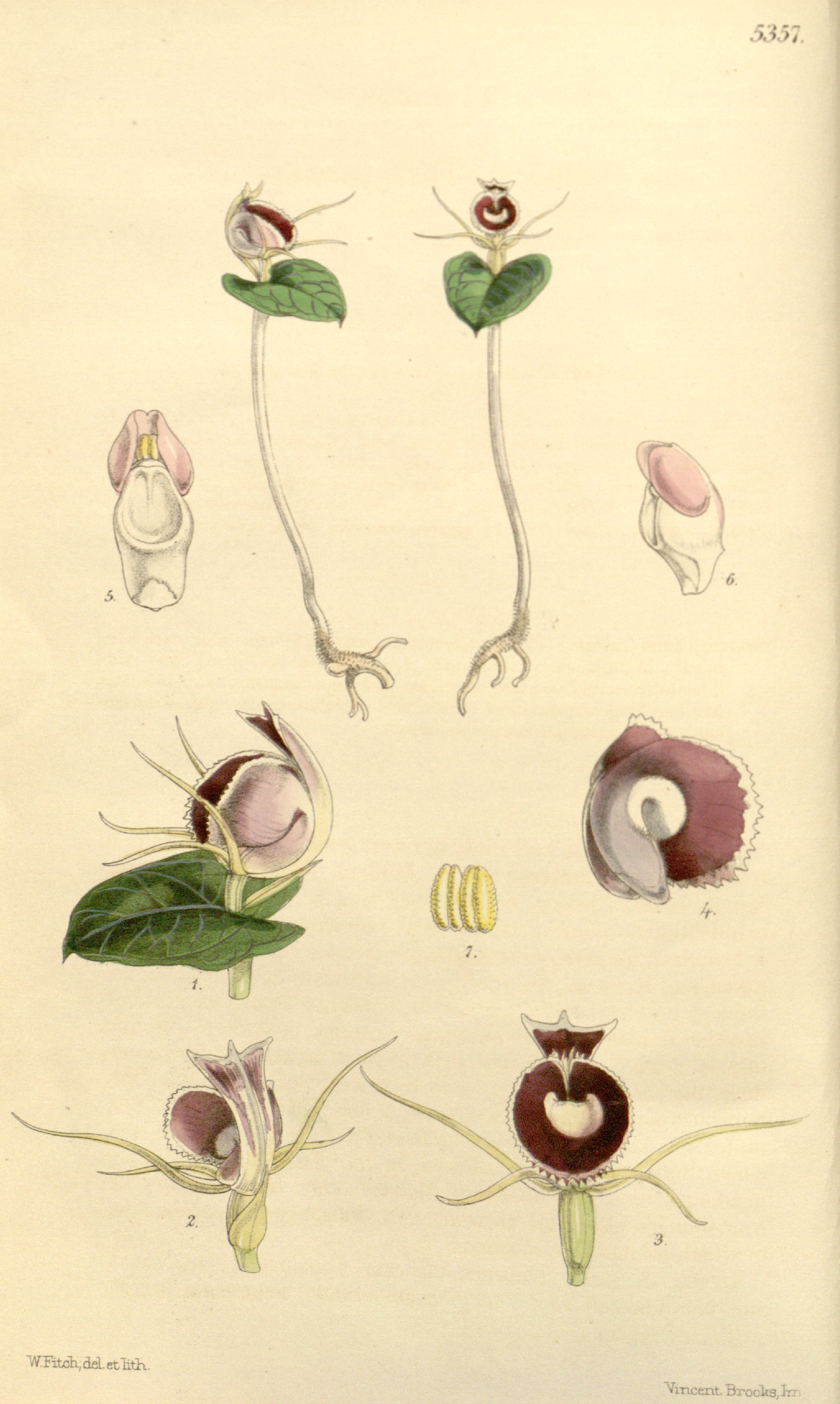
Corybas pictus 1863 illustration from Curtis's Botanical Magazine

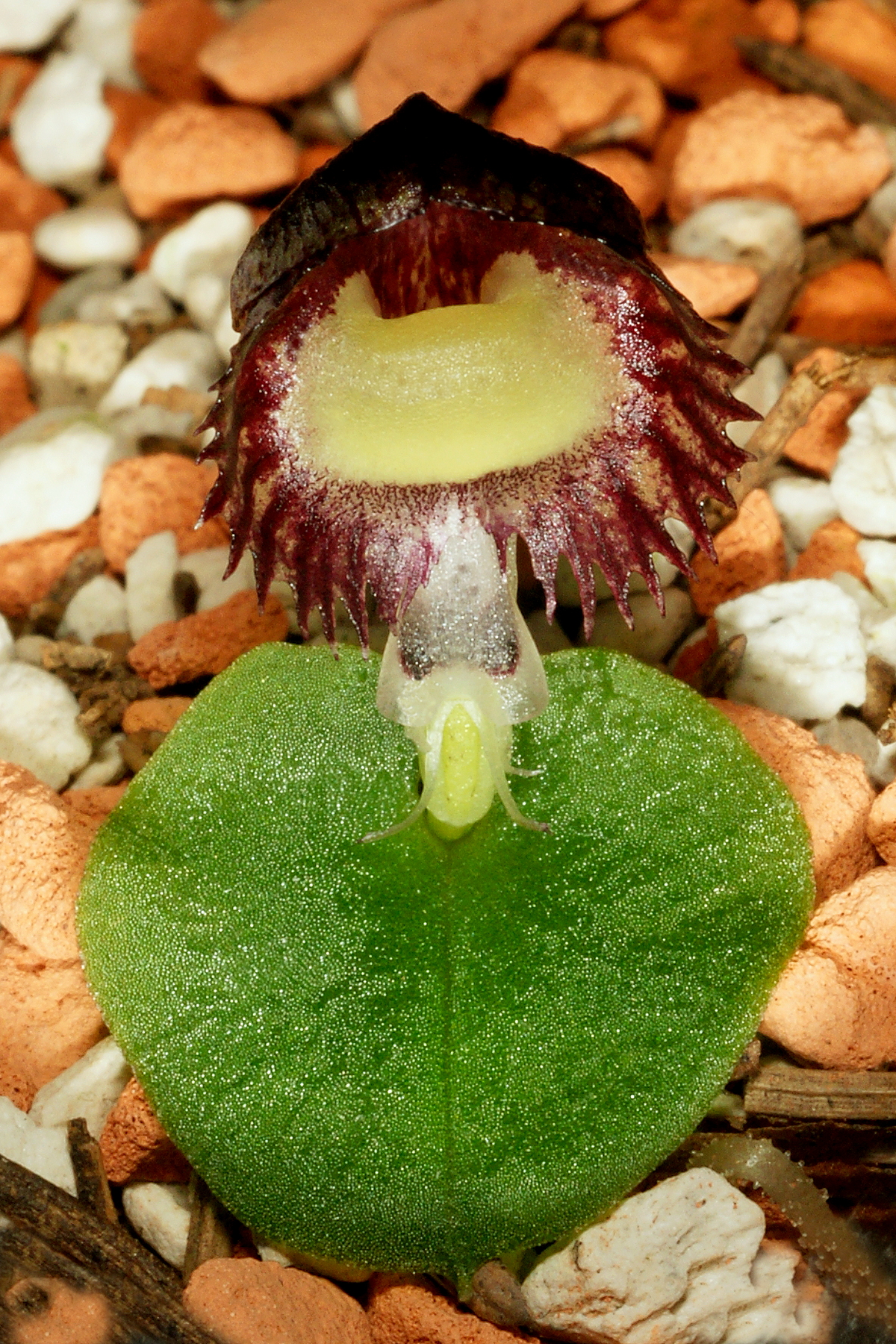
Corybas diemenicus from N.S.W., Vic. and Tas.

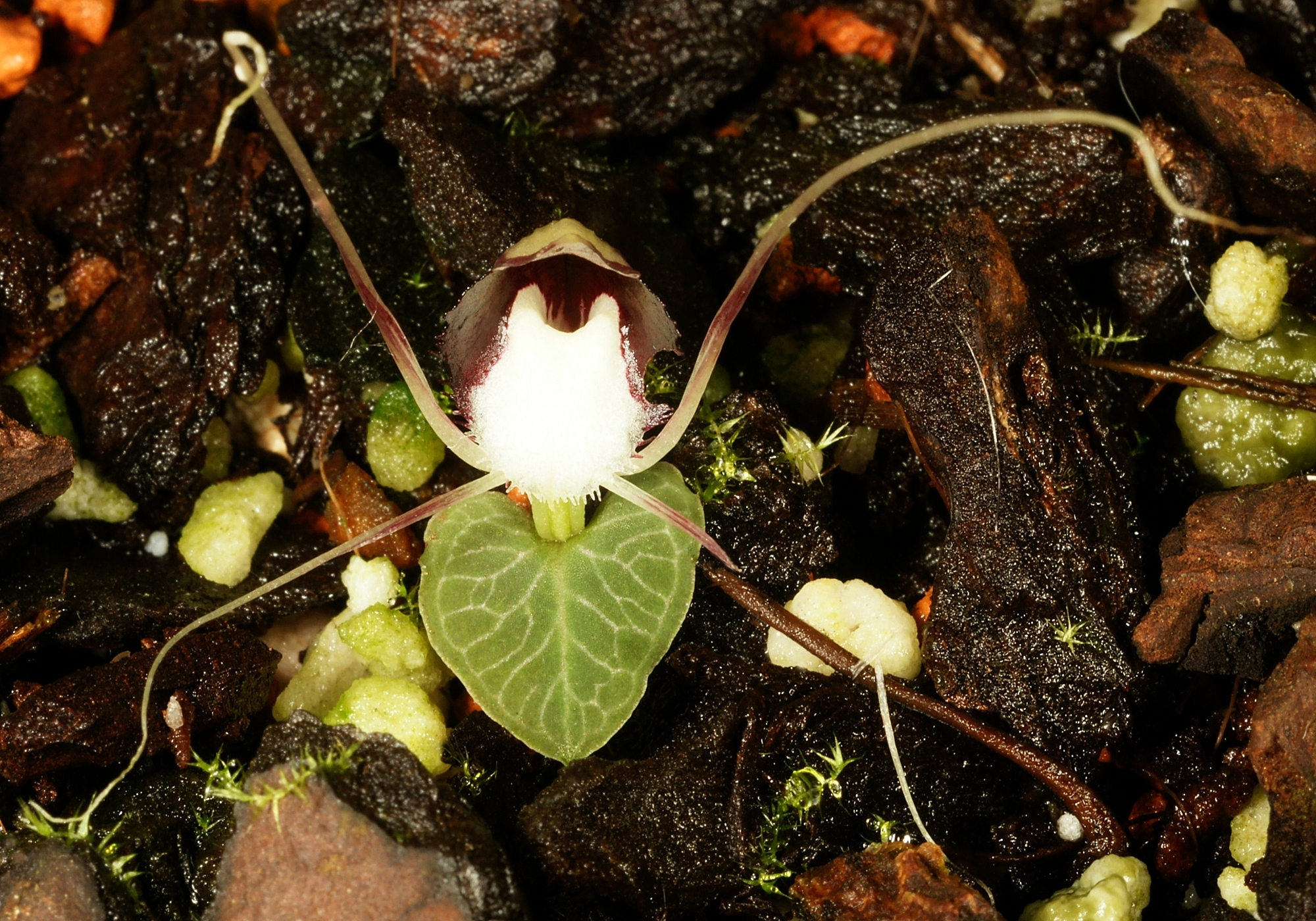
Corybas geminigibbus, from Malaysia and Borneo

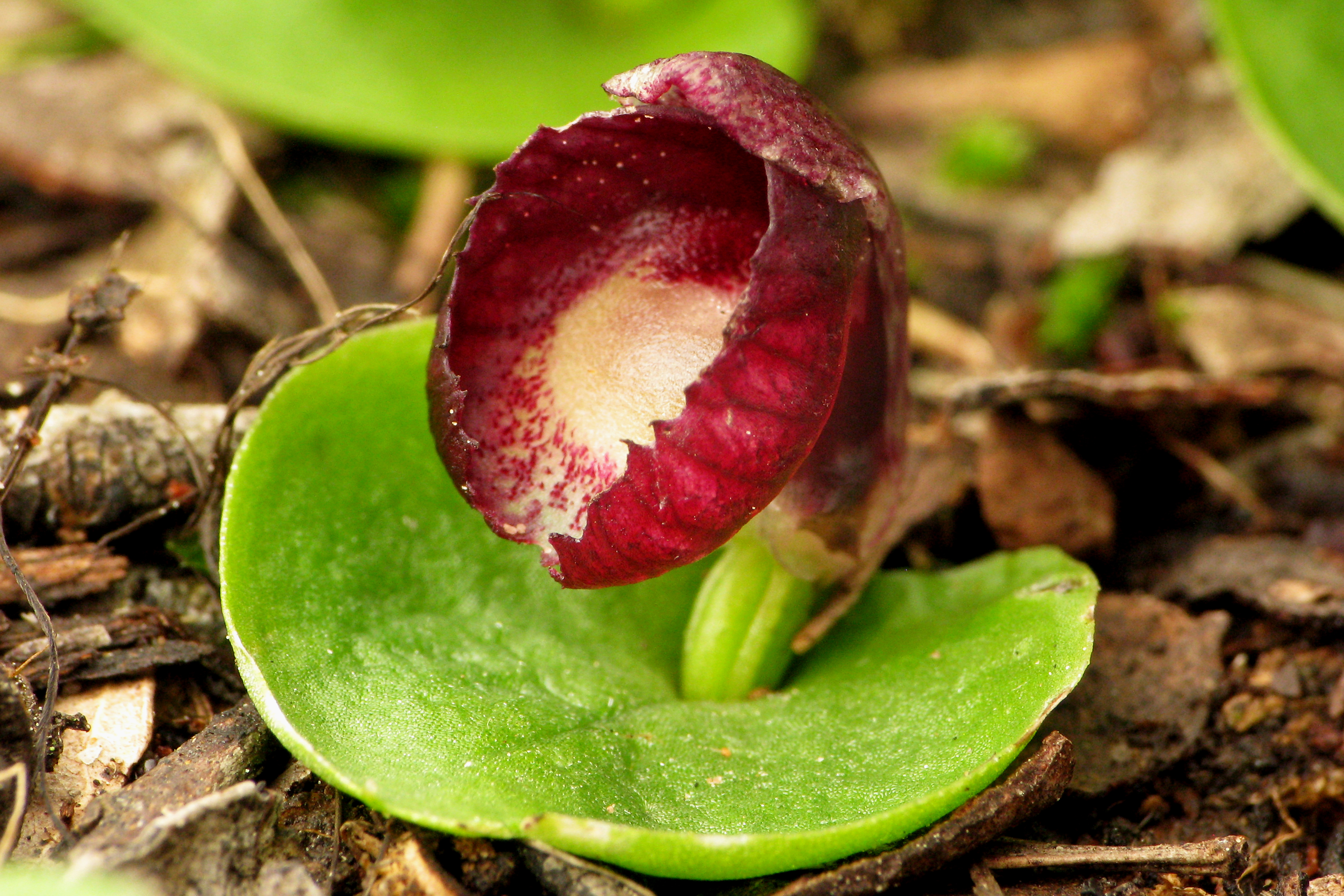
Slaty helmet orchid C. incurvus from N.S.W., Vic, Tas. and S.A.

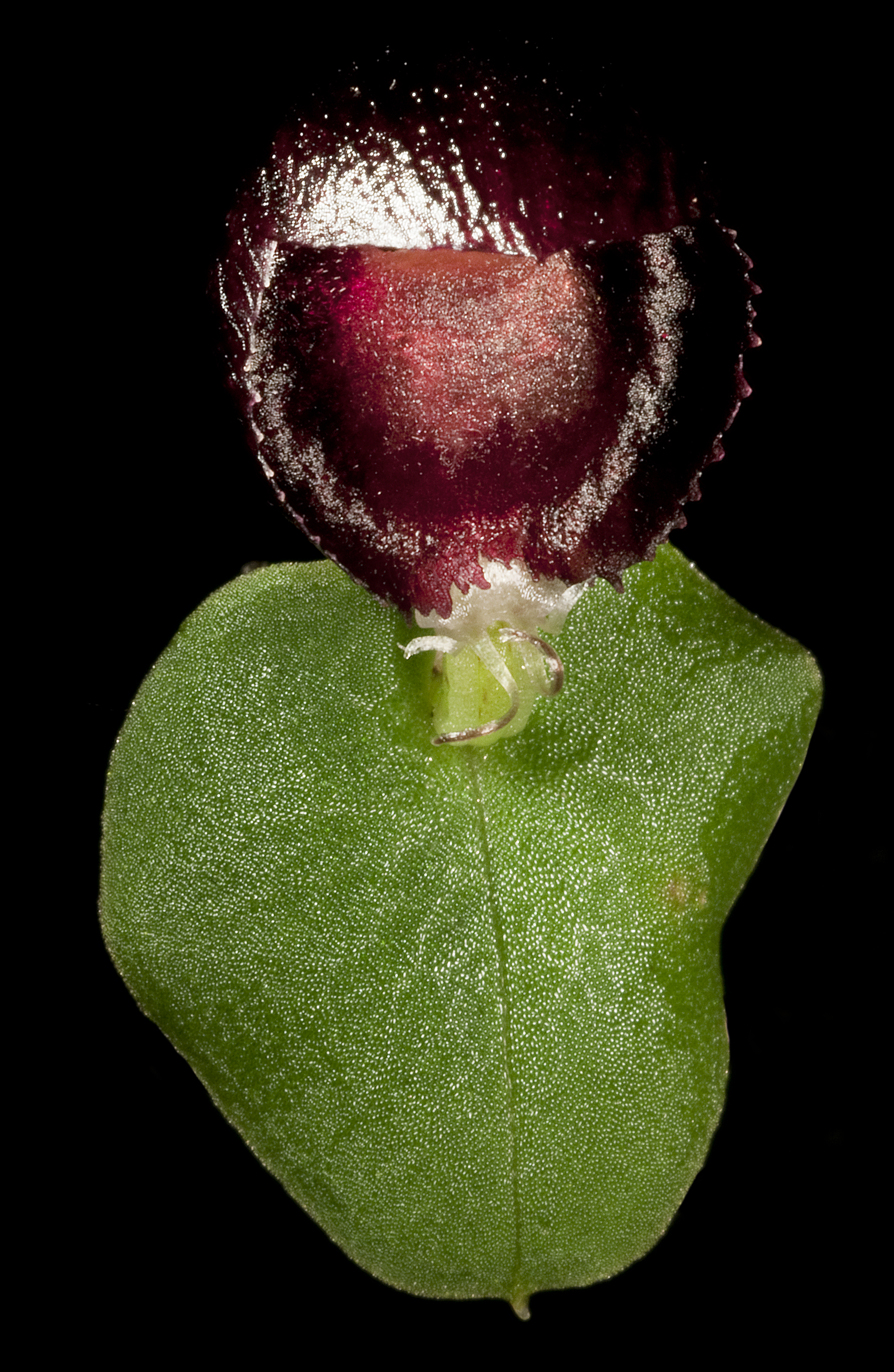
C. recurvus from W.A.

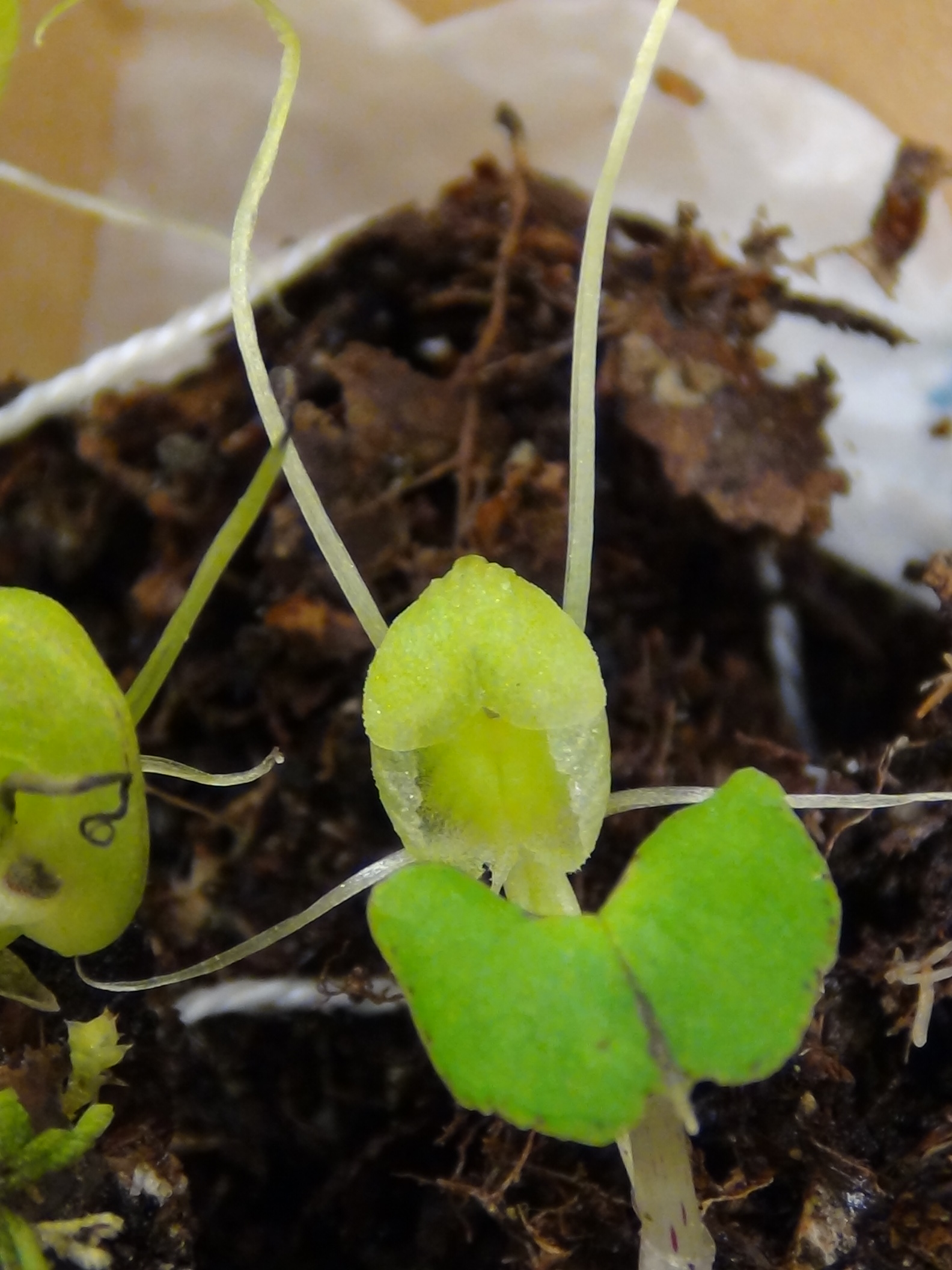
Corybas walliae from New Zealand

== Species ==
As of July 2020, the World Checklist of Selected Plant Families accepts the following species and natural hybrids:

- Corybas abditus D.L.Jones - swamp helmet orchid, small helmet orchid (W.A.)
- Corybas abellianus Dockrill - nodding helmet orchid (Qld.)
- Corybas aberrans P.Royen (New Guinea)
- Corybas aconitiflorus Salisb. - cradle orchid, spurred helmet orchid (Qld., N.S.W., Vic., Tas.)
- Corybas acuminatus M.A.Clem. & Hatch - dancing spider orchid, helmet flower (N.Z.)
- Corybas acutus J.Dransf. & J.B.Comber (Java)
- Corybas aduncus (Schltr.) Schltr. (New Guinea)
- Corybas albipurpureus P.Royen (New Guinea)
- Corybas amabilis P.Royen (New Guinea)
- Corybas amungwiwensis P.Royen (New Guinea)
- Corybas annamensis Aver. (Vietnam)
- Corybas arachnoideus (Schltr.) Schltr. (New Guinea)
- Corybas arfakensis (J.J.Sm.) Schltr. (New Guinea)
- Corybas aristatus (Schltr.) Schltr. (New Guinea)
- Corybas autumnalis A.P.Br. & D.Edmonds (Southwest Australia)
- Corybas bancanus (J.J.Sm.) Schltr. (Sumatra)
- Corybas barbarae D.L.Jones - fairy lanterns (Qld., N.S.W.)
- Corybas betchei (F.Muell.) Schltr. (Samoa)
- Corybas betsyae P.Royen (New Guinea)
- Corybas boridiensis P.Royen (New Guinea)
- Corybas bryophilus J.J.Sm. (Borneo)
- Corybas calcicola J.Dransf. & G.Sm. (Malaysia)
- Corybas callifer (J.J.Sm.) Schltr. (New Guinea)
- Corybas calopeplos J.Dransf. & G.Sm. (Malaysia)
- Corybas calophyllus (Schltr.) Schltr. (New Guinea)
- Corybas carinatus (J.J.Sm.) Schltr. (Malesia)
- Corybas carinulifer (Schltr.) P.Royen (New Guinea)
- Corybas carsei (Cheeseman) Hatch - swamp helmet orchid (N.Z.)
- Corybas caudatus Holttum (Malaysia)
- Corybas cerasinus D.L.Jones & B.Gray - red helmet orchid (Qld.)
- Corybas cheesemanii (Hook.f. ex Kirk) Kuntze - Cheesemans spider orchid (N.Z.)
- Corybas circinatus Tandang & R.A.Bustam.
- Corybas comptus J.Dransf. & G.Sm. (Malaysia)
- Corybas confusus Lehnebach - spider orchid (N.Z.)
- Corybas crenulatus J.J.Sm. (Borneo)
- Corybas cryptanthus Hatch - hidden spider orchid, icky (N.Z.)
- Corybas cyclopensis P.Royen (New Guinea)
- Corybas cymatilis P.Royen (New Guinea)
- Corybas dentatus D.L.Jones - Lofty Ranges helmet orchid (S.A.)
- Corybas despectans D.L.Jones & R.C.Nash - tiny helmet orchid, sandhill helmet orchid (S.A., Vic., W.A.)
- Corybas diemenicus (Lindl.) Rupp - stately helmet orchid (N.S.W., A.C.T., Vic., Tas.)
- Corybas dienemus D.L.Jones - windswept helmet orchid (Macquarie Island)
- Corybas diversifolius S.P.Lyon (Papua New Guinea)
- Corybas dowlingii D.L.Jones - red lanterns (N.S.W.)
- Corybas ecarinatus Anker & Seidenf. (Thailand)
- Corybas echinulus E.Faria (New Caledonia)
- Corybas ekuamensis P.Royen (New Guinea)
- Corybas epiphyticus (J.J.Sm.) Schltr. (New Guinea)
- Corybas erythrocarpus J.J.Sm. (New Guinea)
- Corybas expansus D.L.Jones - flared helmet orchid (S.A.)
- Corybas fanjingshanensis Y.X.Xiong (China)
- Corybas fenestratus P.Royen (New Guinea)
- Corybas fimbriatus (R.Br.) Rchb.f. - fringed helmet orchid (Qld., N.S.W., Vic., Tas.)
- Corybas finisterreanus S.P.Lyon (P.N.G.)
- Corybas fordhamii (Rupp) Rupp - banded helmet orchid (Qld., N.S.W., Vic., S.A., Tas.)
- Corybas fornicatus (Blume) Rchb.f. (Western Malesia to Bali)
- Corybas gastrosiphon (Schltr.) Schltr. (New Guinea)
- Corybas geminigibbus J.J.Sm. (Southeast Asia)
- Corybas gemmatus P.J.Cribb & B.A.Lewis (Solomon Islands)
- Corybas gibbifer (Schltr.) Schltr. (New Guinea)
- Corybas globulus (D.L.Jones & L.M.Copel.) J.M.H.Shaw (N.S.W.)
- Corybas x halleanus E.Faria (New Caledonia)
- Corybas hatchii Lehnebach
- Corybas helensis S.P.Lyon (Papua New Guinea
- Corybas himalaicus (King & Pantl.) Schltr. (east Himalayas to Assam)
- Corybas hispidus D.L.Jones - bristly helmet orchid (Qld., N.S.W., Vic.)
- Corybas holttumii J.Dransf. & G.Sm. (Malaysia)
- Corybas huonensis S.P.Lyon (P.N.G.)
- Corybas hypogaeus (Colenso) Lehnebach
- Corybas imperatorius (J.J.Sm.) Schltr. (Java)
- Corybas incurvus D.L.Jones & M.A.Clem. - slaty helmet orchid (N.S.W., A.C.T., Vic., S.A., Tas.)
- Corybas insulifloris P.Royen (Flores)
- Corybas iridescens Irwin & Molloy - spider orchid, big red (N.Z.)
- Corybas karkarensis P.Royen (Karkar Island)
- Corybas karoensis J.B.Comber & J.Dransf. (Sumatra)
- Corybas kinabaluensis Carr (Sabah)
- Corybas klossii (Ridl.) Schltr. (New Guinea)
- Corybas koresii P.Royen (New Guinea)
- Corybas laceratus L.O.Williams (Luzon)
- Corybas ledermannii (Schltr.) Schltr. (New Guinea)
- Corybas leucotyle (Schltr.) Schltr. (New Guinea)
- Corybas limpidus D.L.Jones - crystal helmet orchid (W.A.)
- Corybas longipedunculatus P.Royen (Solomon Islands)
- Corybas longipetalus (Ridl.) Schltr. (New Guinea)
- Corybas longitubus (D.L.Jones & L.M.Copel.) M.A.M.Renner
- Corybas macranthus (Hook.f.) Rchb.f. - spider orchid (N.Z.)
- Corybas mammillifer P.Royen (New Guinea)
- Corybas mankiensis P.Royen (New Guinea)
- Corybas merrillii (Ames) Ames (Luzon)
- Corybas minimus (R.J.Bates) J.M.H.Shaw (South Australia)
- Corybas minutus (Drake) Schltr. (Society Islands)
- Corybas mirabilis (Schltr.) Schltr. (Solomon Islands to Vanuatu)
- Corybas × miscellus D.L.Jones - hybrid helmet orchid (S.A.)
- Corybas moluccanus (Schltr.) Schltr. (Maluku Islands)
- Corybas montanus D.L.Jones - montane helmet orchid (Qld.)
- Corybas montis-stellaris P.Royen (New Guinea)
- Corybas muluensis J.Dransf. (Borneo)
- Corybas muscicola (Schltr.) Schltr. (Sulawesi)
- Corybas nanus P.Royen (Papua New Guinea)
- Corybas naviculisepalus P.Royen (New Guinea)
- Corybas neocaledonicus (Schltr.) Schltr. (Vanuatu and New Caledonia)
- Corybas oblongus (Hook.f.) Rchb.f. - spider orchid (N.Z.)
- Corybas obscurus Lehnebach - spider orchid (N.Z.)
- Corybas orbiculatus (Colenso) L.B.Moore - spider orchid (N.Z.)
- Corybas palearifer (J.J.Sm.) Schltr. (New Guinea)
- Corybas papa Molloy & Irwin - mudstone spider orchid (N.Z.)
- Corybas papillosus (Colenso) Lehnebach (N.Z.)
- Corybas pictus (Blume) Rchb.f. (Malesia)
- Corybas pignalii E.Faria (New Caledonia)
- Corybas pilifer J.Dransf. (Borneo)
- Corybas ponapensis (Hosok. & Fukuy.) Hosok. & Fukuy. (Pohnpei)
- Corybas porphyrus P.Royen (New Guinea)
- Corybas praetermissus J.Dransf. & J.B.Comber (West Java)
- Corybas pruinosus (R.Cunn.) Rchb.f. - toothed helmet orchid (N.S.W.)
- Corybas puberulus (Schltr.) Schltr. (New Guinea)
- Corybas puniceus T.P.Lin & W.M.Lin (Taiwan)
- Corybas ramosianus J.Dransf. (Philippines)
- Corybas recurvus D.L.Jones - western helmet orchid (W.A.)
- Corybas ridleyanus Schltr. (Malaysia)
- Corybas rivularis (A.Cunn.) Rchb.f. - spider orchid, silverback (N.Z.)
- Corybas roseus (Janch.) Janch. ex J.J.Sm. (West Sumatra)
- Corybas rotundifolius (Hook.f.) Rchb.f. - helmet orchid (N.Z.)
- Corybas royenii Kores (Papua New Guinea)
- Corybas sagittatus S.P.Lyon
- Corybas sanctigeorgianus Lehnebach - St. George's spider orchid (N.Z.)
- Corybas saprophyticus (Schltr.) Schltr. (New Guinea)
- Corybas scutellifer J.B.Comber & J.Dransf. (North Sumatra)
- Corybas selangorensis J.Dransf. & G.Sm. (Malaysia)
- Corybas serpentinus J.Dransf. (Sabah)
- Corybas sexalatus J.J.Sm. (New Guinea)
- Corybas simbuensis P.Royen (New Guinea)
- Corybas sinii Tang & F.T.Wang (Guangxi and Taiwan)
- Corybas smithianus Schltr. (New Guinea)
- Corybas solomonensis P.Royen (Solomon Islands)
- Corybas speculum (Schltr.) Schltr. (New Guinea)
- Corybas stenotribonos J.B.Comber & J.Dransf. (North Sumatra)
- Corybas striatus (Schltr.) Schltr. (New Guinea)
- Corybas subalpinus P.Royen (New Guinea)
- Corybas sulcatus (M.A.Clem. & D.L.Jones) G.N.Backh. - grooved helmet orchid (Macquarie Island)
- Corybas taiwanensis T.P.Lin & S.Y.Leu (Taoyuan)
- Corybas taliensis Tang & F.T.Wang (W. Sichuan and West Yunnan)
- Corybas torricellensis (Schltr.) Schltr. (New Guinea)
- Corybas trilobus (Hook.f.) Rchb.f. – spider orchid (N.Z.)
- Corybas umbonatus (Schltr.) Schltr. (New Guinea)
- Corybas umbrosus J.Dransf. & J.B.Comber (Java)
- Corybas undulatus (R.Cunn.) Rupp - tailed helmet orchid (Qld., N.S.W.)
- Corybas unguiculatus (R.Br.) Rchb.f. - small helmet orchid, pelicans (Australia)
- Corybas urikensis P.Royen (New Guinea)
- Corybas ventricosus (J.J.Sm.) Schltr. (New Guinea)
- Corybas vespertilionis P.Royen (New Guinea)
- Corybas villosus J.Dransf. & G.Sm. (Malaysia)
- Corybas vinosus (J.J.Sm.) Schltr. (West Java)
- Corybas viridisepalus S.P.Lyon (Papua New Guinea)
- Corybas vitreus Lehnebach - spider orchid (N.Z.)
- Corybas walliae Lehnebach - Zeller's spider orchid (N.Z.)
