= Corybas expansus =

Flared helmet orchid

Scientific classification
- Kingdom: Plantae
- Clade: Tracheophytes
- Clade: Angiosperms
- Clade: Monocots
- Order: Asparagales
- Family: Orchidaceae
- Subfamily: Orchidoideae
- Tribe: Diurideae
- Genus: Corybas
- Species: C. expansus

Binomial name
- Corybas expansus D.L.Jones

Synonyms
- Corybas aff. despectans; Corybas sp. B; Corysanthes expansa (D.L.Jones) D.L.Jones & M.A.Clem.; Corybas despectans auct. non D.L.Jones & R.C.Nash

Species of orchid

Corybas expansus, commonly known as the flared helmet orchid or dune helmet orchid is a species of terrestrial orchid that is endemic to South Australia. It has a heart-shaped to more or less round leaf and a single purplish flower with greenish or transparent areas.

== Description ==
Corybas expansus is a terrestrial, perennial, deciduous, herb which forms small colonies. It has a broad heart-shaped or almost round leaf 15–30 mm (0.6–1 in) long and 18–30 mm (0.7–1 in) wide. The leaf is bright green on the upper surface and silvery green on the lower side. The single flower is erect, reddish purple with greenish or translucent areas, 12–15 mm (0.5–0.6 in) long and 11–13 mm (0.4–0.5 in) wide. The dorsal sepal is mostly transparent green, 12–16 mm (0.5–0.6 in) long and 5–7 mm (0.20–0.28 in) wide. It is erect near its base then curves forward, partly covering the labellum. The lateral sepals are linear but tapered, 5 mm (0.2 in) long, 1 mm (0.04 in) wide and joined to each other at the base. The petals are lance-shaped, about 3 mm (0.12 in) long, 1 mm (0.04 in) wide and curved. The labellum is longer than the dorsal sepal and forms a tube about 4 mm (0.2 in) long near its base, before curving and flattening into a concave dish shape, 13–15 mm (0.5–0.6 in) long and 11–13 mm (0.4–0.5 in) wide. The upper part of the labellum is reddish purple grading to white from the centre down. There are teeth or serrations up to 1.5 mm (0.06 in) long around the edges of the labellum. Flowering occurs in July and August.

== Taxonomy ==
Corybas expansus was first formally described in 1991 by David Jones from a specimen collected in the Warrenben Conservation Park and the description was published in Australian Orchid Research. The specific epithet (expansus) is a Latin word meaning "spread out", referring to the flared labellum.

In 2002, David Jones and Mark Clements proposed splitting Corybas into smaller genera and placing this species into Corysanthes but the change has not been widely accepted.

== Distribution and habitat ==
The flared helmet orchid grows on the lee side of dunes in the shelter of trees (especially Eucalyptus diversifolia) and in sandy loam in sheltered places. It occurs in coastal areas on the southern tip of the Eyre, Yorke and Fleurieu Peninsulas and on Kangaroo Island.

== Conservation status ==
Corybas expansus is classified as "vulnerable" under the South Australian National Parks and Wildlife Act 1972. The main threats to the species are inappropriate fire regimes and weed invasion.
