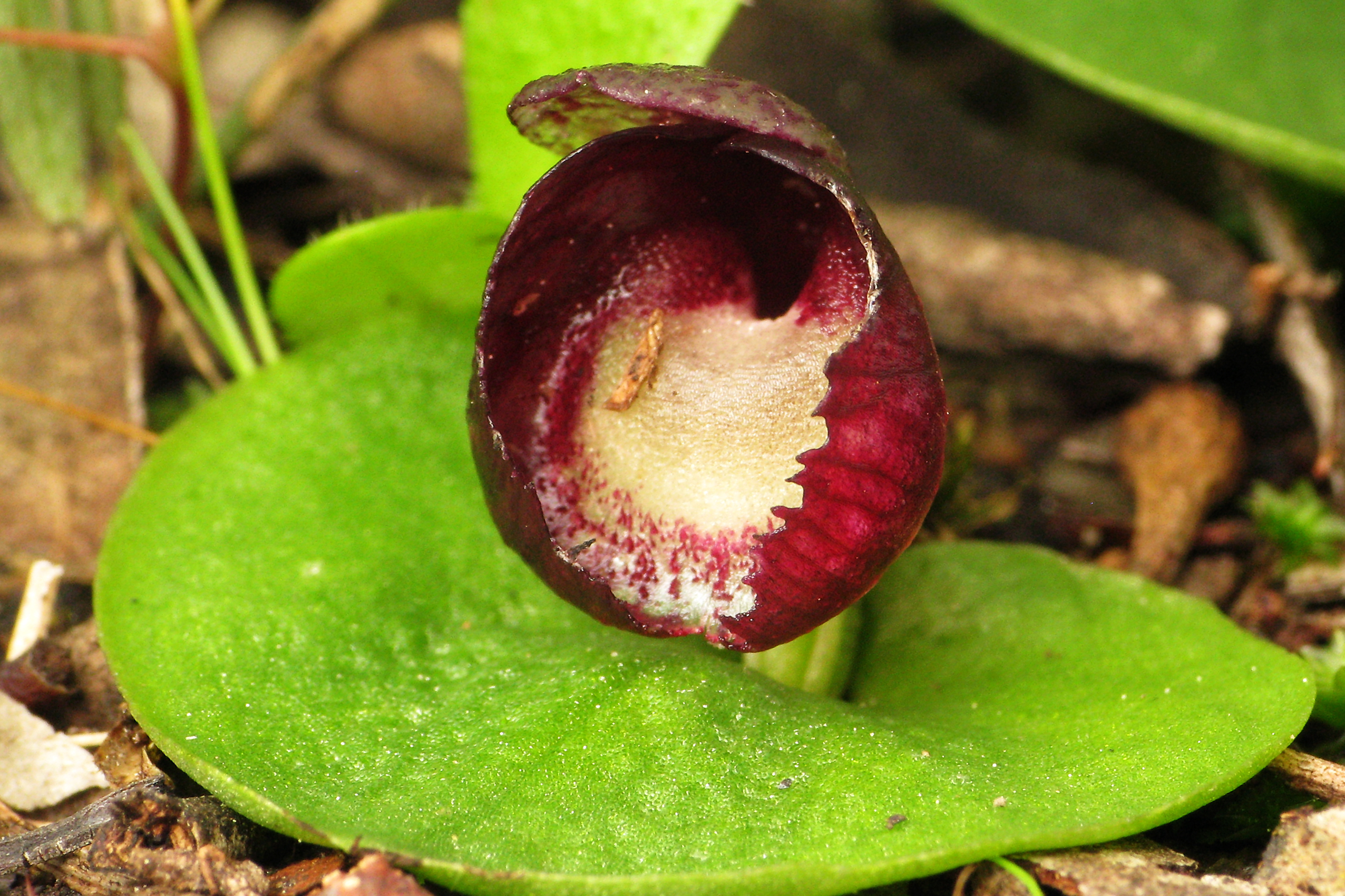

Scientific classification
- Kingdom: Plantae
- Clade: Tracheophytes
- Clade: Angiosperms
- Clade: Monocots
- Order: Asparagales
- Family: Orchidaceae
- Subfamily: Orchidoideae
- Tribe: Diurideae
- Genus: Corybas
- Species: C. incurvus

Binomial name
- Corybas incurvus D.L.Jones & M.A.Clem.

Synonyms
- Corysanthes hamiltonii Rupp & Nicholls nom. inval., nom. nud.; Corysanthes incurva (D.L.Jones & M.A.Clem.) D.L.Jones & M.A.Clem.; Corybas diemenicus auct. non (Lindl.) Rupp & Nicholls: Willis, J.H. (1970); Corybas diemenicus auct. non (Lindl.) Rupp & Nicholls: Curtis, W.M. (1980); Corysanthes pruinosa auct. non R.Cunn.: Rodway, L. (1903)

= Corybas incurvus =

Slaty helmet orchid

Species of orchid

Corybas incurvus, commonly known as the slaty helmet orchid, is a species of terrestrial orchid endemic to south-eastern Australia. It has a broad egg-shaped to heart-shaped leaf and a dark purple flower with a white patch in the middle.

== Description ==
Corybas incurvus is a terrestrial, perennial, deciduous, herb that has a broad egg-shaped to heart-shaped leaf 15–30 mm (0.6–1 in) long and 15–25 mm (0.6–1 in) wide. The leaf is dark green on the upper surface and silvery green on the lower side. The single flower is dark purple, 12–17 mm (0.5–0.7 in) long and 10–15 mm (0.4–0.6 in) wide. The dorsal sepal is greenish with purple markings, 18–22 mm (0.7–0.9 in) long, 12–14 mm (0.47–0.55 in) wide and curves forward forming a hood over the labellum. The lateral sepals are linear, about 5 mm (0.2 in) long, 0.5 mm (0.02 in) wide and joined at their base. The petals are about 3 mm (0.1 in) long, 0.5 mm (0.02 in) wide, often with tip divided into two. The labellum is tube shaped near its base, the tube about 10–15 mm (0.4–0.6 in) long, then opens into a flattened area a further 10–15 mm (0.4–0.6 in) long and broad. There is a white patch in the centre of the labellum and the edges turn inwards and have a few short teeth. Flowering occurs from June to August.

== Taxonomy ==
Corybas incurvus was first formally described in 1988 by David Jones and Mark Clements from a specimen collected near Tyabb and the description was published in the Kew Bulletin. The specific epithet (incurvus) refers to the in-turned edges of the labellum.

== Distribution and habitat ==
The slaty helmet orchid grows in moist heath, woodland and forest south from Cowra in New South Wales, in all but the north-west of Victoria, in the south-east of South Australia and in Tasmania.
