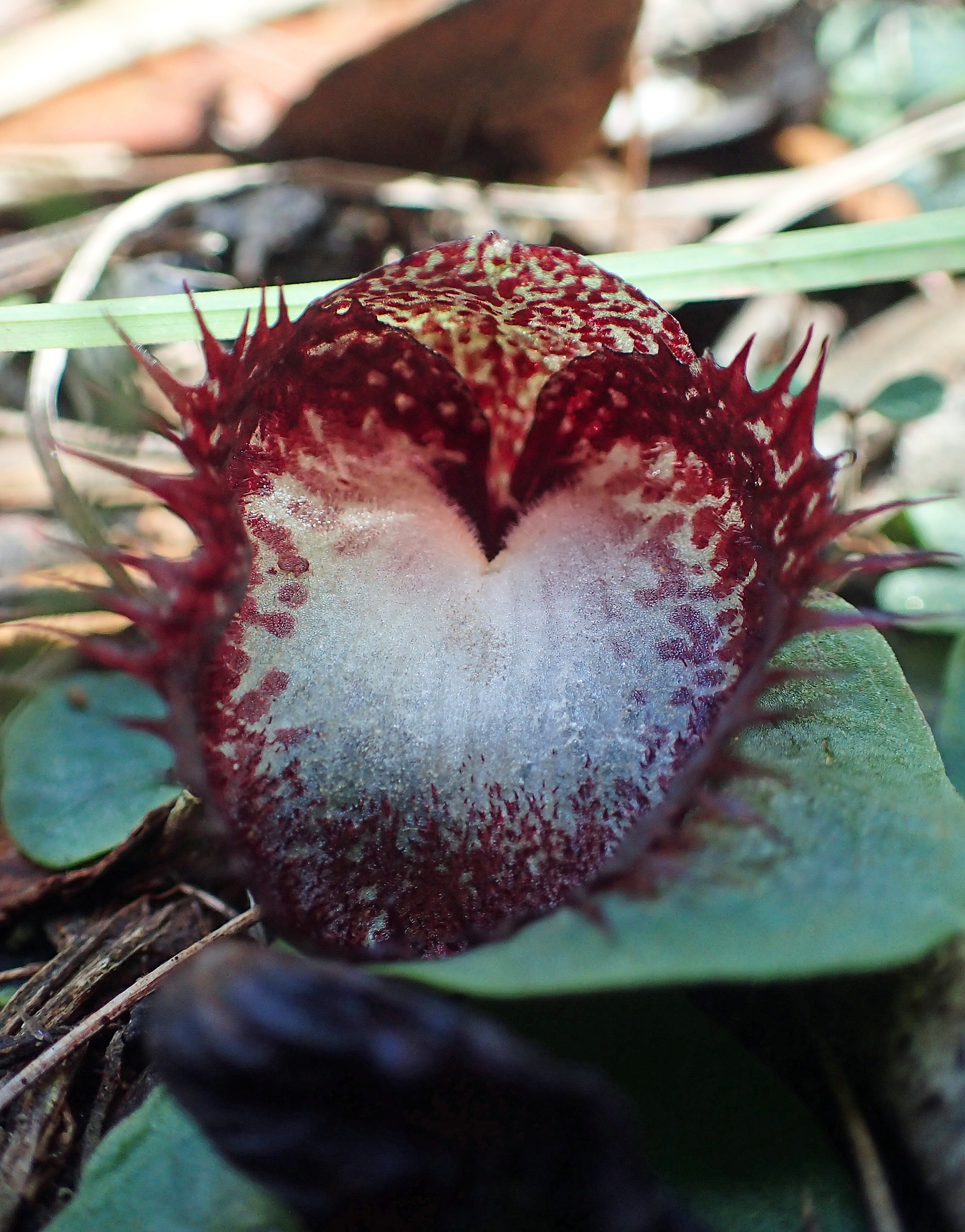
- Corybas hispidus near Ebor

Scientific classification
- Kingdom: Plantae
- Clade: Tracheophytes
- Clade: Angiosperms
- Clade: Monocots
- Order: Asparagales
- Family: Orchidaceae
- Subfamily: Orchidoideae
- Tribe: Diurideae
- Genus: Corybas
- Species: C. hispidus

Binomial name
- Corybas hispidus (D.L.Jones)

Synonyms
- Corysanthes hispida D.L.Jones D.L.Jones & M.A.Clem.

= Corybas hispidus =

Bristly helmet orchid

Species of orchid

Corybas hispidus, commonly known as the bristly helmet orchid, is a species of orchid endemic to eastern Australia. It is distinguished from other helmet orchids by its autumn to winter flowering period, and by its labellum, which has a bristly-hairy, creamy-white centre and is deeply notched along its top edge.

== Description ==
Corybas hispidus is a terrestrial, perennial, deciduous herb with an underground tuber. It has a single dark green leaf that is more or less circular in shape, 15–35 mm (0.59–1.38 in) long and wide and silvery-green or reddish on the lower surface. The single flower is reddish-purple and white with a greenish-grey dorsal sepal with red or dark purple spots. The dorsal sepal is egg-shaped or spoon-shaped, forms a hood over the labellum and is 22–35 mm (0.87–1.38 in) long and 11–18 mm (0.43–0.71 in) wide when flattened. The lateral sepals are linear in shape, 5–9 mm (0.20–0.35 in) long and about 1 mm (0.039 in) wide. The petals are about 5 mm (0.20 in) long and 1 mm (0.039 in) wide, linear in shape except for near their base, which is wing-shaped. The labellum is tube-shaped, 20–30 mm (0.79–1.18 in) long and wide and the edges have many linear teeth. The central "boss" of the labellum is dome-shaped and white with a notch at the top and the surface is covered with short, stiff bristles. Flowering is from March to August.

== Taxonomy and naming ==
Corybas hispidus was first formally described in 1973 by David Jones from a specimen found near the village of Wulgulmerang. The description was published in The Victorian Naturalist. It was the first of many orchids described by Jones. The specific epithet (hispidus) is a Latin word meaning "bristly", "rough", "hairy" or "prickly".

== Distribution and habitat ==
Bristly helmet orchid occurs in south-east Queensland, on the ranges and tablelands of New South Wales and in sheltered sites in far north-eastern Victoria.
