= Mount Duval =

Mount Duval is the name of several geographic features including:

- Mount Duval (New South Wales) - Australia
- Mount Duval (Nunavut) - Canada
- Mount Duval - Antarctica
