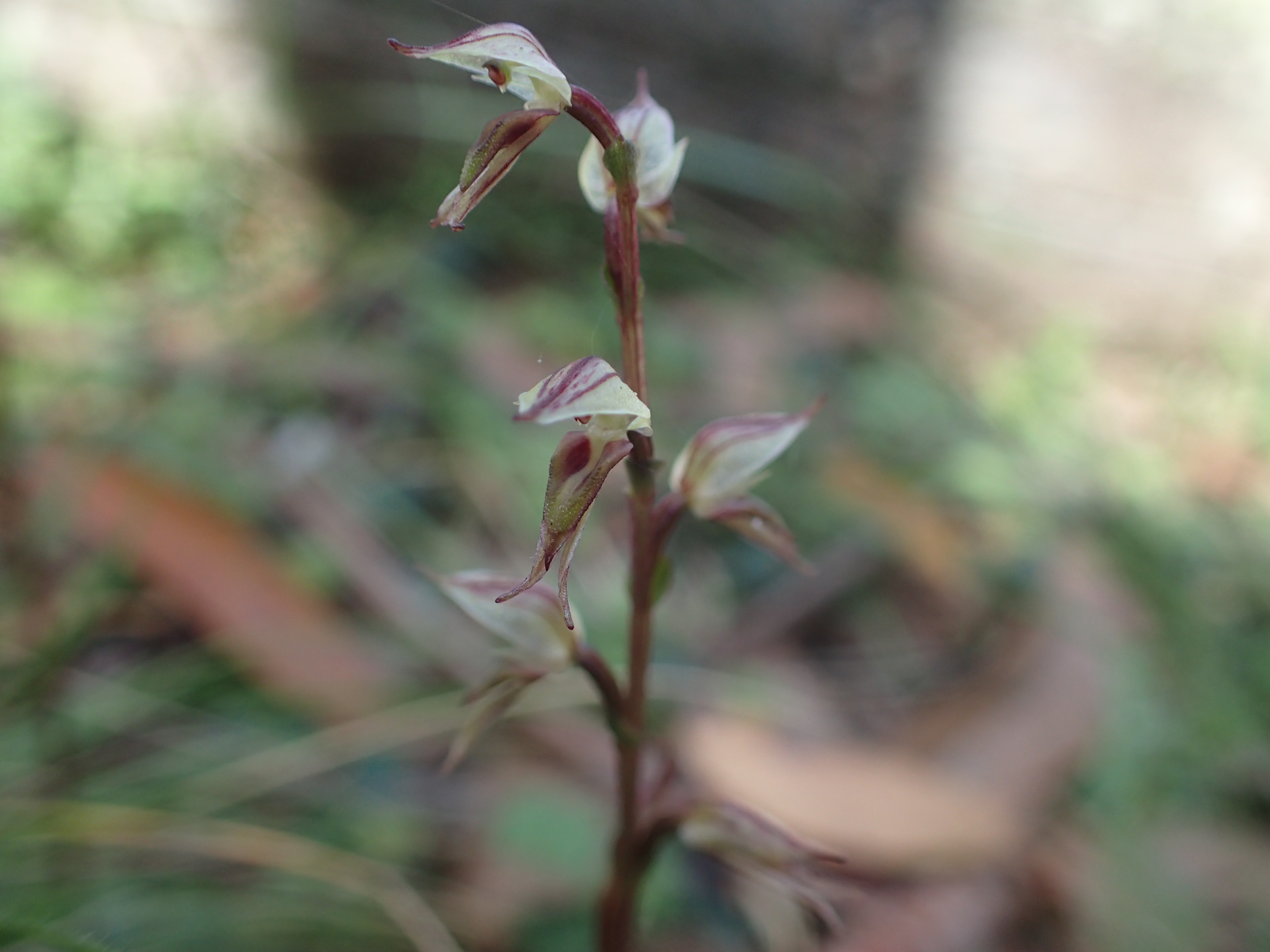
- Acianthus apprimus growing near Ebor

Scientific classification
- Kingdom: Plantae
- Clade: Tracheophytes
- Clade: Angiosperms
- Clade: Monocots
- Order: Asparagales
- Family: Orchidaceae
- Subfamily: Orchidoideae
- Tribe: Diurideae
- Genus: Acianthus
- Species: A. apprimus

Binomial name
- Acianthus apprimus D.L.Jones

= Acianthus apprimus =

Early mosquito orchid

Species of flowering plant

Acianthus apprimus, commonly known as early mosquito orchid, is a species of flowering plant in the orchid family Orchidaceae and is endemic to New South Wales in Australia. It is a terrestrial herb with a single, heart-shaped leaf and between two and nine translucent pinkish flowers with reddish markings and is found in disjunct populations around the state.

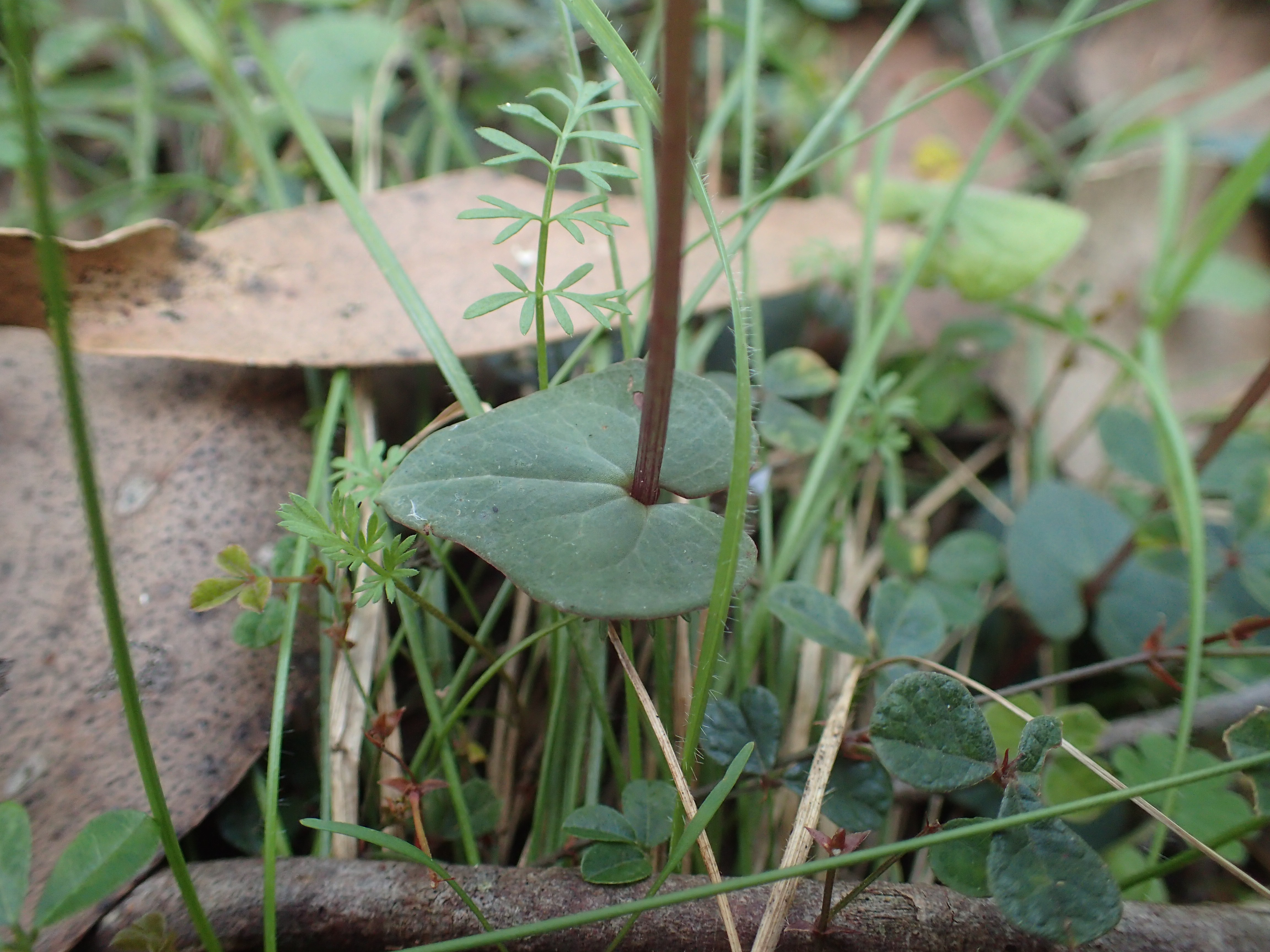
Acianthus apprimus leaf

== Description ==
Acianthus apprimus is a terrestrial, perennial, deciduous, sympodial herb with a single heart-shaped, glabrous, dark green leaf which is reddish-purple on its lower surface. The leaf is 18–40 mm (0.7–2 in) long, 14–35 mm (0.6–1 in) wide on a stalk 4–9 cm (2–4 in) high.

There are between two and nine flowers, well-spaced on a raceme 5–20 cm (2–8 in) tall, each flower 9–12 mm (0.4–0.5 in) long and about 7 mm (0.3 in) across. The dorsal sepal is egg-shaped, 9–14 mm (0.4–0.6 in) long, 4–6 mm (0.16–0.24 in) wide, forms a hood over the column and is translucent pink with reddish veins and markings. The lateral sepals are 9–12 mm (0.4–0.5 in) long, pinkish with a red stripe down the centre and cross each other below the labellum. The petals are a similar colour, about 4 mm (0.2 in) long and project forward. The labellum is dark purplish-red to almost black, egg-shaped to lance-shaped, has a thick, fleshy callus covering most of the central area and many small pimple-like papillae on the outer half. It is 5.5–7 mm (0.2–0.3 in) long, 2.5–4 mm (0.1–0.2 in) wide with its edges turned under. This is one of the earliest-flowering Acianthus species and although it resembles Acianthus fornicatus, usually flowers between February and April, before the leaves of that species have emerged above ground. The capsule that develops is 6–8 mm (0.2–0.3 in) long and 2–2.5 mm (0.08–0.1 in) wide.

This species is distinguished from the similar Acianthus fornicatus by its folded labellum which leaves only the callus in view, and by its very early flowering period - A. fornicatus flowers from May to August.

== Taxonomy and naming ==
Acianthus apprimus was first formally described by David Jones in 1991 and the description was published in Australian Orchid Research from specimens he found near Mount Wilson the previous year. The specific epithet (apprimus) is a Latin word meaning "the very first" referring to the early flowering habit of this species. In a 1995 paper published in the journal Allertonia, Paul Kores claimed that A. apprimus and 3 other species are not distinct from A. fornicatus and should be regarded as synonyms. That position has been adopted by Plants of the World Online.

== Distribution and habitat ==
This orchid grows among grass, shrubs and bracken in tall montane forest at altitudes between 500 and 1,200 m (1,600 and 3,900 ft). It is found in the Blue Mountains, New England National Park, near Walcha and on Mount Duval.

== Conservation ==
When first described, this species was rated 2R on the ROTAP list, but since a review in 2007 it has not been listed in terms of the EPBC Act.
