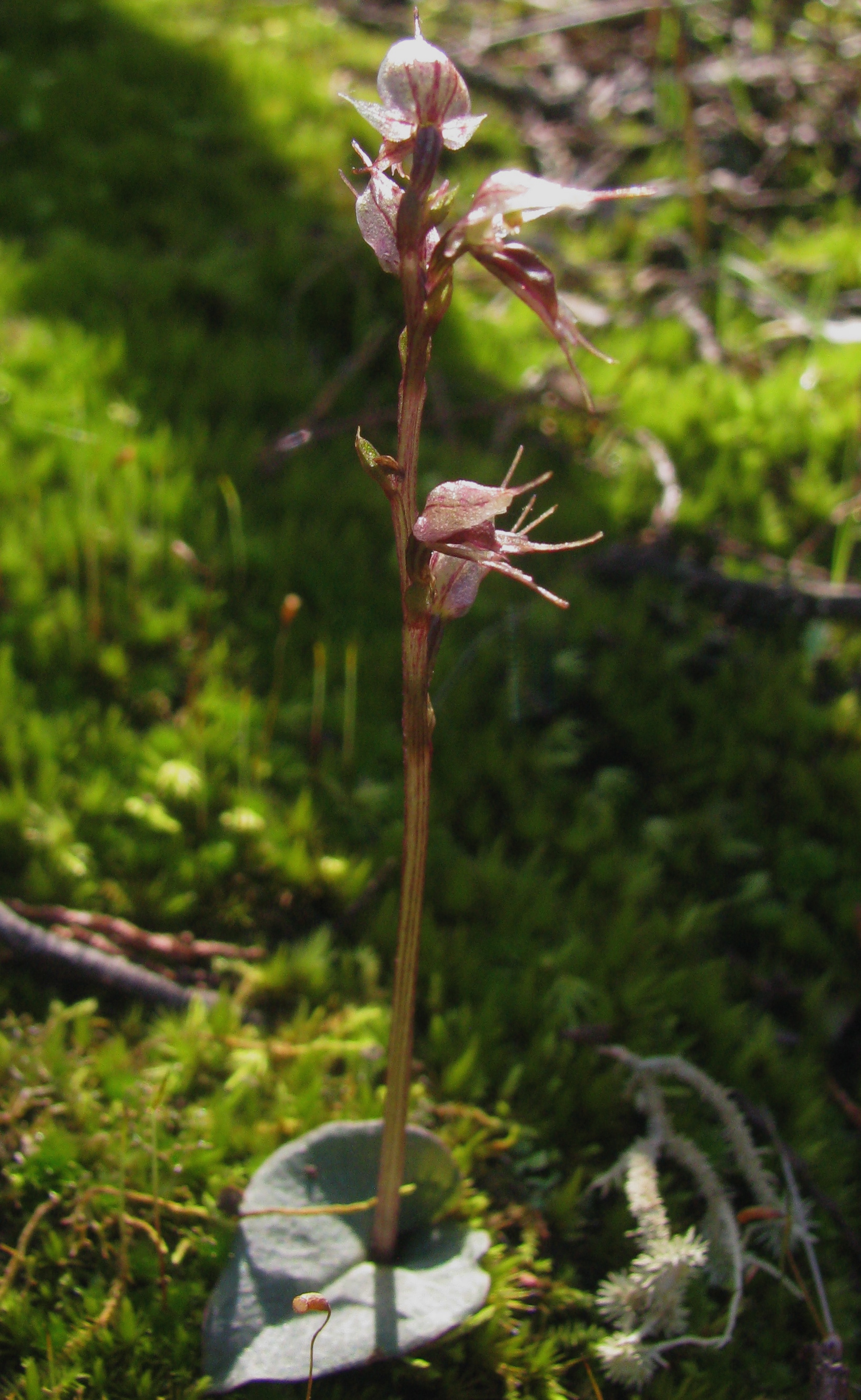

Scientific classification
- Kingdom: Plantae
- Clade: Tracheophytes
- Clade: Angiosperms
- Clade: Monocots
- Order: Asparagales
- Family: Orchidaceae
- Subfamily: Orchidoideae
- Tribe: Diurideae
- Genus: Acianthus
- Species: A. collinus

Binomial name
- Acianthus collinus D.L.Jones

= Acianthus collinus =

Hooded mosquito orchid

Species of flowering plant

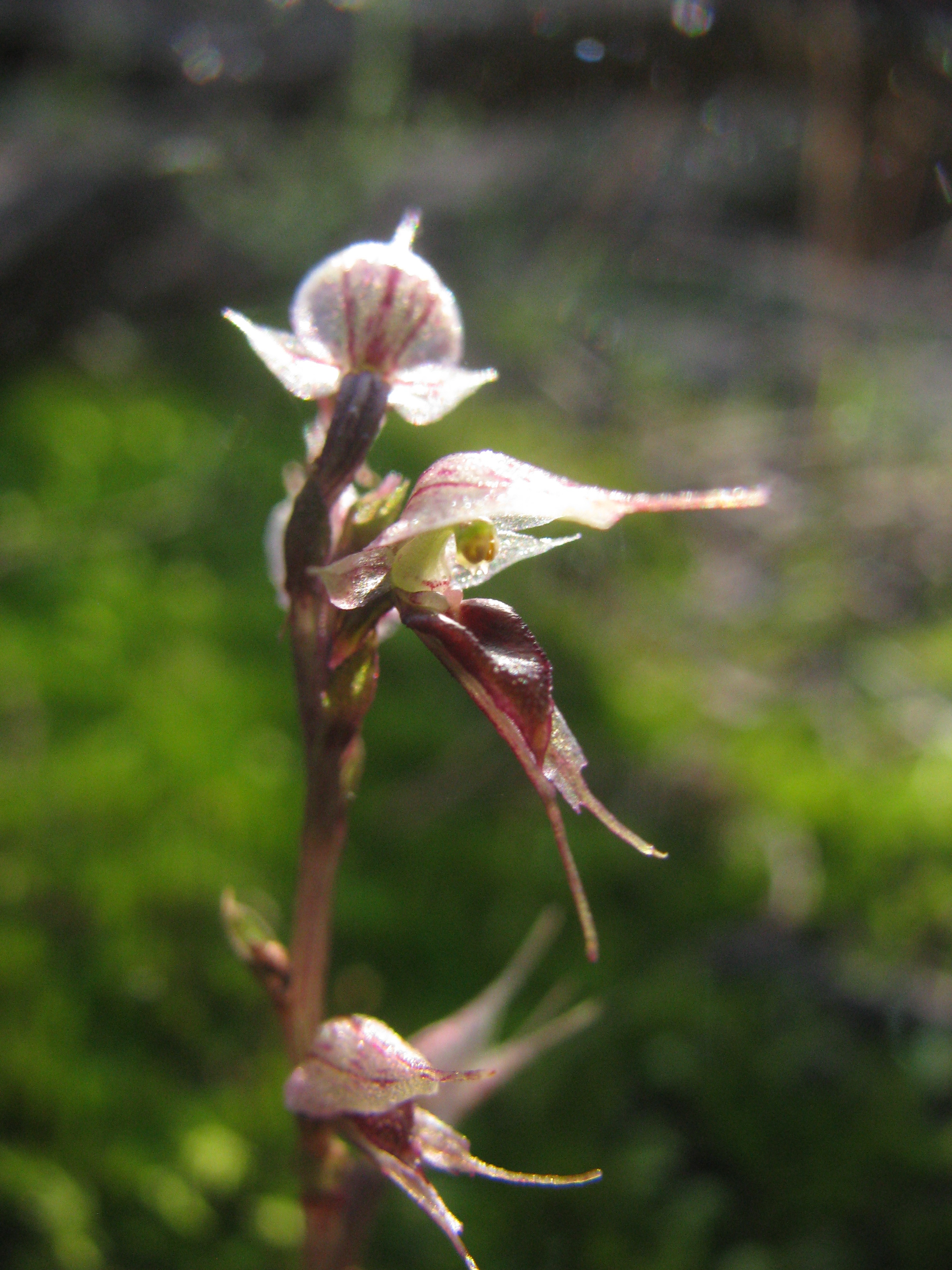
Flower detail

Acianthus collinus, commonly known as hooded mosquito orchid or inland mosquito orchid, is a species of flowering plant in the orchid family Orchidaceae and is endemic to south-eastern continental Australia. It is a terrestrial herb with a single, heart-shaped leaf and between two and nine translucent pinkish flowers with reddish markings and is found growing in colonies on sheltered slopes in open forest in on the western slopes of the Great Dividing Range.

== Description ==
Acianthus collinus is a terrestrial, perennial, deciduous, sympodial herb with a single heart-shaped, glabrous, dark green leaf which is reddish-purple on its lower surface. The leaf is 15–32 mm (0.6–1 in) long, 14–30 mm (0.6–1 in) wide on a stalk 3–6 cm (1–2 in) high.

There are between two and nine flowers well-spaced on a thin raceme 6–15 cm (2–6 in) tall, each flower 8–11 mm (0.3–0.4 in) long. The dorsal sepal is egg-shaped, 6–8 mm (0.2–0.3 in) long, 4–5 mm (0.16–0.20 in) wide, translucent pink with reddish veins and markings and forms a hood over the column. The central vein extends about 1.5 mm (0.06 in) beyond the end of the labellum. The lateral sepals are 7–11 mm (0.3–0.4 in) long, about 1.3 mm (0.05 in) wide, linear to lance-shaped, pinkish with a red stripe down the centre and usually cross each other below the labellum. The petals are a similar colour and are about 3–5 mm (0.1–0.2 in) long, narrow egg-shaped to lance-shaped and spread widely. The labellum is dark purplish-red to purplish-maroon, 5.5–6.0 mm (0.22–0.24 in) wide, 3.0–3.5 mm (0.12–0.14 in) wide, roughly heart-shaped when flattened, the edges curled under with irregular teeth. The thick, fleshy callus covering most of the central area is dark, purplish red and has many small pimple-like papillae on the outer half. Flowering occurs from late June to August and the capsule that follows is 6–8 mm (0.2–0.3 in) long and 2.0–3.0 mm (0.08–0.1 in) wide and is straight or slightly curved.

This species is distinguished from the similar Acianthus fornicatus by its translucent pinkish flowers, narrower petals and narrower dorsal sepal. It was not known in Victoria before 1999 where it is now known to occur in two or three places with populations containing hundreds of plants. It is easily overlooked and may occur elsewhere in the region. It is easily distinguished in Victoria by its broad sepal.

== Taxonomy and naming ==
Acianthus collinus was first formally described by David Jones in 1991 and the description was published in Australian Orchid Research from specimens he found with Mark Clements in the Conimbla National Park. The specific epithet (collinus) is a Latin word meaning "growing on a hill" referring to the usual habitat of this species. In a 1995 paper published in the journal Allertonia, Paul Kores claimed that A. collinus and 3 other species are not distinct from A. fornicatus and should be regarded as a synonyms. That position has been adopted by Plants of the World Online.

== Distribution and habitat ==
This orchid grows in colonies, usually on gently sloping hillsides in open forest. It is found in the Northern Tablelands, Central Tablelands, Southern Tablelands, North West Slopes and Central West Slopes of New South Wales, Black Mountain in the ACT and the Chiltern-Mt Pilot National Park in Victoria.

== Conservation ==
This orchid is listed as "vulnerable" in the Victorian Government Flora and Fauna Guarantee Act (1998).
