= Acianthus borealis =

Northern mosquito orchid

Scientific classification
- Kingdom: Plantae
- Clade: Tracheophytes
- Clade: Angiosperms
- Clade: Monocots
- Order: Asparagales
- Family: Orchidaceae
- Subfamily: Orchidoideae
- Tribe: Diurideae
- Genus: Acianthus
- Species: A. borealis

Binomial name
- Acianthus borealis D.L.Jones

Synonyms
- Acianthus fornicatus R.Br.

Species of flowering plant

Acianthus borealis, commonly known as northern mosquito orchid, is a species of flowering plant in the orchid family Orchidaceae and is endemic to Queensland in Australia. It is a glabrous, terrestrial herb with a single, heart-shaped leaf and between two and twenty transparent pinkish flowers with reddish markings and is widely distributed on the eastern tablelands.

== Description ==
Acianthus borealis is a terrestrial, perennial, deciduous, sympodial herb with a single heart-shaped, glabrous, dark green leaf which is reddish-purple on its lower surface and often has a wavy margin. It forms spreading colonies and each plant has two fleshy tubers. The leaf is 15–50 mm (0.6–2 in) long, 15–35 mm (0.6–1 in) wide, with its edges sometimes slightly wavy.

There are between two and twenty flowers, crowded on a thin raceme up to 25 cm (10 in) tall, each flower 8.5–10 mm (0.3–0.4 in) long. The dorsal sepal is egg-shaped, 9–10 mm (0.35–0.39 in) long, 3.5–4.5 mm (0.14–0.18 in) wide, forms a hood over the labellum and has three prominent, red veins. The central vein projects forward to a point 2–3.5 mm (0.08–0.1 in) long at the front of the flower. The lateral sepals are 8–9 mm (0.3–0.4 in) long, about 1 mm (0.04 in) wide, project forwards below the labellum, sometimes crossed, sometimes parallel. The petals are about 2.5–5 mm (0.1–0.2 in) long, about 1 mm (0.04 in) wide, lance-shaped and pointed. The labellum is reddish with a serrated, purplish edge, 5–6 mm (0.20–0.24 in) long, 2.5–3 mm (0.098–0.12 in) wide and narrow oblong in shape. The callus is green, covers most of the labellum and has many pimply papillae near its end. The column is 3 mm (0.1 in) long and widest at its base. Flowering occurs between March and May and the capsule that follows is 11–13 mm (0.4–0.5 in) long, 2.5 mm (0.1 in) wide, oval shaped and has red lines on its ribs.

This species is distinguished from the similar Acianthus fornicatus by smaller flowers, narrower dorsal sepal, narrower petals and much more northerly distribution.

== Taxonomy and naming ==
Acianthus borealis was first formally described by David Jones in 1991 and the description was published in Australian Orchid Research from specimens found near Herberton on the Atherton Tableland. The specific epithet (borealis) is from the Latin borealis (northern). This species has the most northerly distribution in the Acianthus fornicatus alliance in Australia. In a 1995 paper published in the journal Allertonia, Paul Kores claimed that A. borealis and 3 other species are not distinct from A. fornicatus and should be regarded as a synonyms. That position has been adopted by Plants of the World Online.

== Distribution and habitat ==
This orchid grows on sheltered ridges and slopes in forest and woodland at altitudes between 400 and 800 m (1,000 and 3,000 ft), often in sandy soil near boulders where it forms dense, clonal colonies. It is found on tablelands from the Windsor Tableland in the north-east to the Blackdown Tableland in the central east.

== Ecology ==
The leaf of this orchid appears near the end of the wet season. The small purplish flowers last from four days to a week, resemble mosquitoes and are insect-pollinated. The aerial parts of the plants die down as warm weather returns.

== Conservation ==
This orchid is widespread and locally common with its populations often occurring in national parks.
