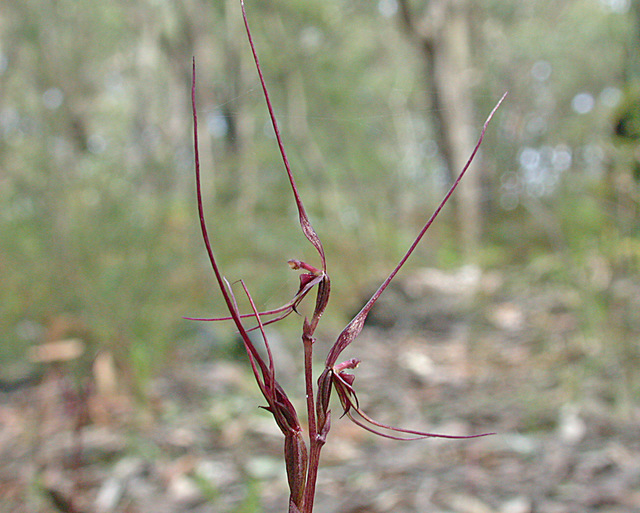
- Acianthus caudatus growing in the Budy Bim National Park

Scientific classification
- Kingdom: Plantae
- Clade: Tracheophytes
- Clade: Angiosperms
- Clade: Monocots
- Order: Asparagales
- Family: Orchidaceae
- Subfamily: Orchidoideae
- Tribe: Diurideae
- Subtribe: Acianthinae
- Genus: Acianthus
- Species: A. caudatus

Binomial name
- Acianthus caudatus R.Br.

Synonyms
- Acianthus caudatus var. ater Lindl.; Acianthus caudatus R.Br. var. caudatus; Acianthus caudatus var. pallidus Rupp; Epipactis caudata (R.Br.) Poir.; Nemacianthus caudatus (R.Br.) D.L.Jones & M.A.Clem.

= Acianthus caudatus =

Mayfly orchid

Species of flowering plant

Acianthus caudatus, commonly known as mayfly orchid, is a species of flowering plant in the orchid family Orchidaceae and is endemic to eastern Australia. It is a terrestrial herb with a single egg-shaped or heart-shaped leaf and up to nine dark purplish flowers with thin, spreading sepals and petals, often with a musty odour.

== Description ==
Acianthus caudatus is a terrestrial, perennial, deciduous, sympodial herb with a single thin, egg-shaped to heart-shaped leaf which is dark green on the upper surface and reddish-purple on its lower surface. The leaf is 8–30 mm (0.3–1 in) long, 6–20 mm (0.2–0.8 in) wide and has wavy or minutely toothed edges. There are up to nine dark purplish flowers on a raceme 50–250 mm (2–10 in) high, each flower 30–40 mm (1–2 in) long. The dorsal sepal is erect, expanded near its base, 15–25 mm (0.6–1 in) long and tapers to a fine point. The lateral sepals are a similar shape but shorter, 15–25 mm (0.6–1 in) long and spread apart from each other. The petals are narrow lance-shaped, 3–5 mm (0.1–0.2 in) long, curved and spread apart from each other. The labellum is egg-shaped to wedge-shaped, 5–6 mm (0.20–0.24 in) long and about 3 mm (0.1 in) wide with the tip turned downwards. Flowering occurs from August to October.

== Taxonomy and naming ==
Acianthus caudatus was first formally described in 1810 by Robert Brown and the description was published in Prodromus Florae Novae Hollandiae et Insulae Van Diemen. The specific epithet (caudatus) is derived from the Latin word cauda meaning "tail".

== Distribution and habitat ==
Mayfly orchid grows among low shrubs in open forest south of the Manning River in New South Wales, through Victoria to the Eyre Peninsula in South Australia. It is also found in Tasmania.
