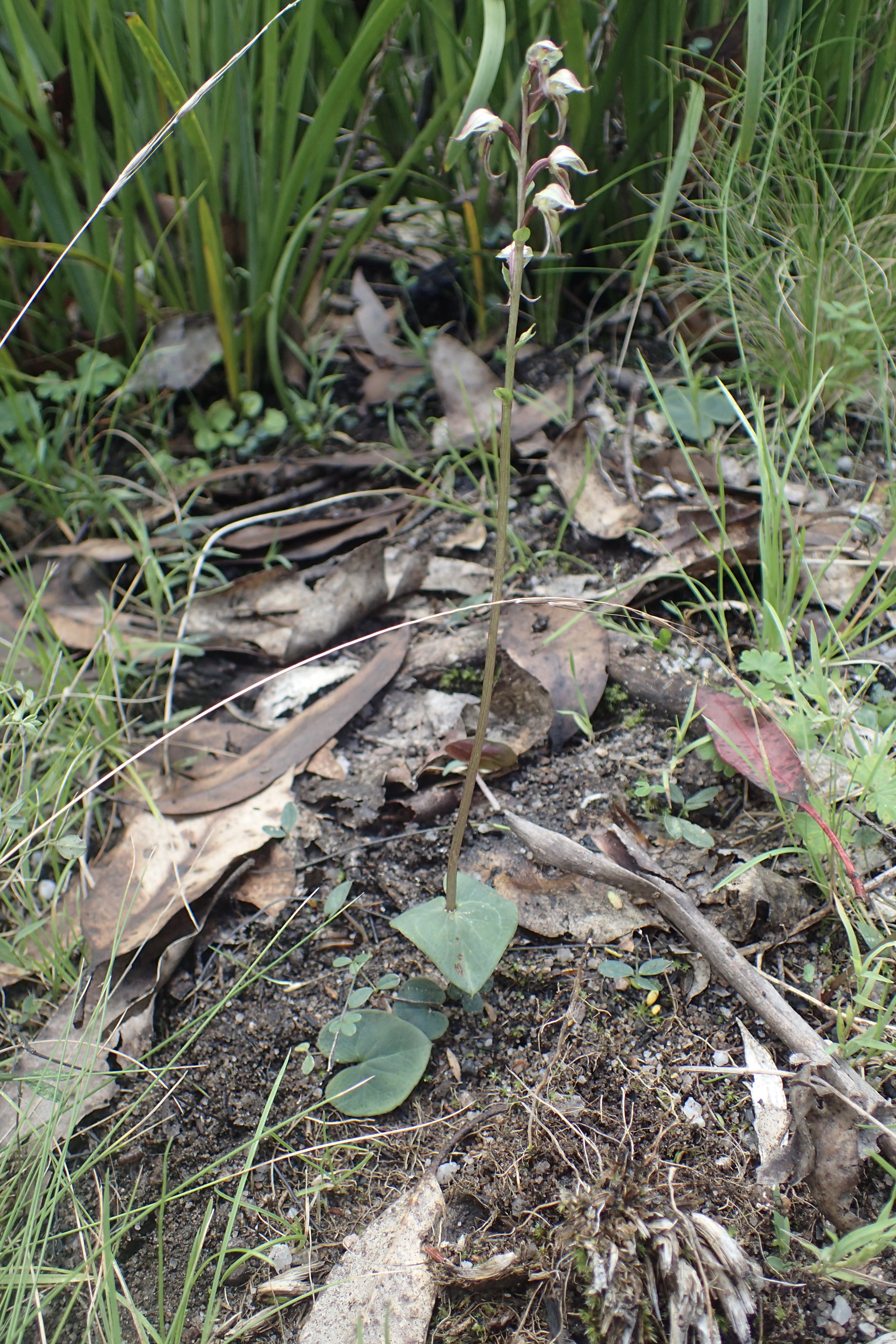

Scientific classification
- Kingdom: Plantae
- Clade: Tracheophytes
- Clade: Angiosperms
- Clade: Monocots
- Order: Asparagales
- Family: Orchidaceae
- Subfamily: Orchidoideae
- Tribe: Diurideae
- Genus: Acianthus
- Species: A. cuneatus

Binomial name
- Acianthus cuneatus D.L.Jones & L.M.Copel.

= Acianthus cuneatus =

New England mosquito orchid

Species of flowering plant

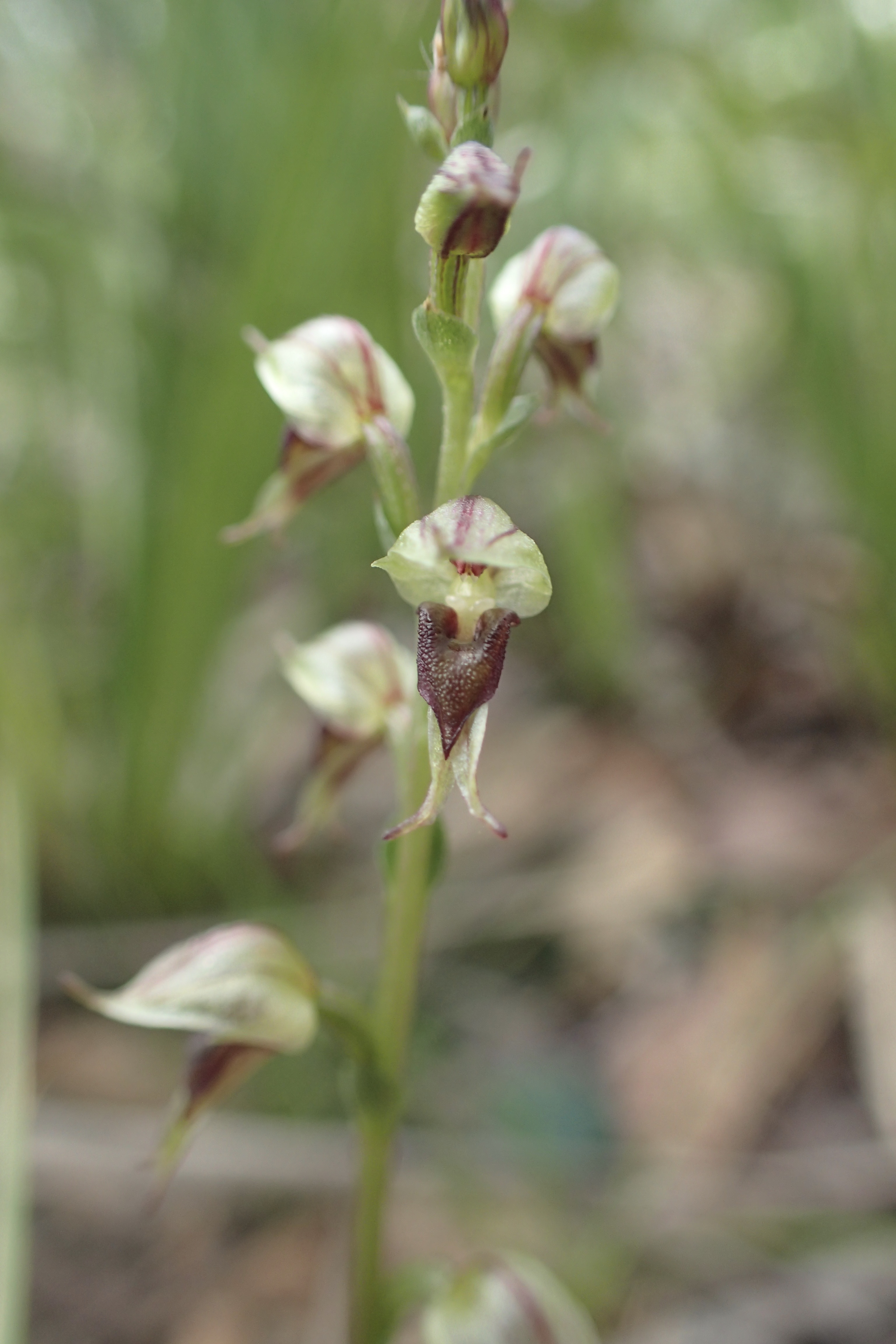
Labellum detail

Acianthus cuneatus, commonly known as New England mosquito orchid, is a species of flowering plant in the orchid family Orchidaceae and is endemic to the Northern Tablelands of New South Wales. It is a terrestrial herb with a single, heart-shaped leaf and up to seven translucent greenish flowers with purplish stripes and is found growing in sheltered slopes in open forest.

== Description ==
Acianthus cuneatus is a terrestrial, perennial, deciduous, sympodial herb with a single heart-shaped, glabrous, dark green leaf that is purplish on its lower surface. The leaf is 20–65 mm (0.79–2.56 in) long, 15–48 mm (0.59–1.89 in) wide on a stalk 10–20 mm (0.39–0.79 in) tall. There are up to seven, well-spaced, translucent greenish flowers with fine purpish stripes on a thin raceme 50–200 mm (2.0–7.9 in) tall, each flower 7–9 mm (0.28–0.35 in) long. The dorsal sepal is egg-shaped, 6–7 mm (0.24–0.28 in) long, 4–5 mm (0.16–0.20 in) wide, translucent pink with purplish lines and forms a hood over the column. The lateral sepals are 5.5–6.5 mm (0.22–0.26 in) long, about 1.3 mm (0.051 in) wide, and linear to lance-shaped, the tips often curving backwards or outwards. The petals are translucent and are about 3.5–4 mm (0.1–0.2 in) long and curve inwards. The labellum is purple, 5–6 mm (0.20–0.24 in) long, 3–4 mm (0.12–0.16 in) wide and wedge-shaped, the callus dark purplish red with a central channel about 1 mm (0.039 in) wide. Flowering occurs from February to April.

== Taxonomy and naming ==
Acianthus cuneatus was first formally described by in 2017 David Jones and Lachlan Mackenzie Copeland and the description was published in Australian Orchid Review from specimens collected on Mount Duval in 1994. The specific epithet (cuneatus) is a Latin word meaning "wedge-shaped", referring to the shape of the labellum

== Distribution and habitat ==
This orchid grows on slopes and in sheltered areas in tall open forest on the higher parts of the Northern Tableland between Coolah Tops and Tenterfield in New South Wales.
