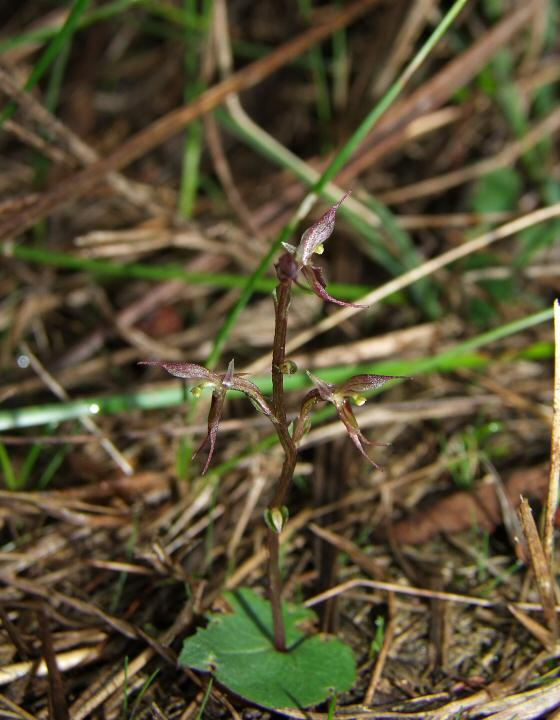
- In The Gurdies Nature Conservation Reserve

Scientific classification
- Kingdom: Plantae
- Clade: Tracheophytes
- Clade: Angiosperms
- Clade: Monocots
- Order: Asparagales
- Family: Orchidaceae
- Subfamily: Orchidoideae
- Tribe: Diurideae
- Genus: Acianthus
- Species: A. pusillus

Binomial name
- Acianthus pusillus D.L.Jones

= Acianthus pusillus =

Small mosquito orchid

Species of flowering plant

Acianthus pusillus, commonly known as small mosquito orchid, is a species of flowering plant in the orchid family Orchidaceae and is endemic to eastern Australia. It is a terrestrial herb with a single, heart-shaped leaf and up to 18 small, translucent green or pinkish flowers with reddish marking and a green to reddish-purple labellum. It is widely distributed, growing in moist places from central-eastern Queensland, south through New South Wales and Victoria to South Australia and Tasmania.

== Description ==
Acianthus pusillus is a terrestrial, perennial, deciduous, sympodial herb with a single heart-shaped, glabrous, dark green leaf which is reddish-purple on its lower surface. The leaf is 12–32 mm (0.5–1 in) long, 10–30 mm (0.4–1 in) wide on a stalk 30–80 mm (1–3 in) tall.

There are up to 18 translucent green to pinkish flowers with reddish veins and spots on a thin raceme, 30–180 mm (1–7 in) tall, each flower 8–12 mm (0.3–0.5 in) long extending out from the raceme. The dorsal sepal is linear to egg-shaped, 6–8.5 mm (0.2–0.3 in) long, 2.5 mm (0.098 in) wide with a point 1–2.5 mm (0.04–0.1 in) long and forms a hood covering the column. The lateral sepals are 6–8 mm (0.2–0.3 in) long, about 1 mm (0.04 in) wide, linear to narrow lance-shaped, with a tip 1–2.5 mm (0.04–0.1 in) long and project forwards, either obliquely, parallel or crossed. The petals are translucent with a red strip in the centre and are 2.5–3 mm (0.098–0.12 in) long, about 1 mm (0.04 in) wide, linear to egg-shaped and point backwards towards the ovary. The labellum is 4.0–4.5 mm (0.16–0.18 in) wide, 2–3 mm (0.08–0.1 in) wide, heart-shaped to elliptic when flattened, slightly dished near the base with the edges rolled under but lacking teeth. The thick, fleshy callus covers most of the upper surface of the labellum and sometimes has many small pimple-like papillae on the outer half. Flowering occurs from March to August and the capsule that follows is oval-shaped, 7–8 mm (0.28–0.31 in) long and about 2 mm (0.08 in) wide.

This species is distinguished from the similar A. exsertus by its usually smaller leaf, smaller flowers and much smaller labellum.

== Taxonomy and naming ==
Acianthus pusillus was first formally described by David Jones in 1991 and the description was published in Australian Orchid Research. The specific epithet (pusillus) is a Latin word meaning "very small" in reference to the small flowers and small stature of this species.

== Distribution and habitat ==
This orchid is widespread and locally common in a range of habitats from rainforest margins to heathland on inland hills. In Queensland, it occurs in the Port Curtis and Moreton botanical districts; in New South Wales on the North Coast, Central Coast and South Coast, Northern, Central and Southern Tablelands; in southern parts of Victoria; in the Flinders Ranges, Eyre Peninsula, Northern and Southern Mount Lofty, Murray, Yorke Peninsula, Kangaroo Island and South-Eastern Botanical Regions of South Australia and in Tasmania. It sometimes forms colonies of thousands of plants, the leaves often carpeting the ground.

== Conservation ==
Acianthus pusillus is not threatened in New South Wales.
