= Acianthus ledwardii =

Conservation status
- Extinct (EPBC Act)

Scientific classification
- Kingdom: Plantae
- Clade: Tracheophytes
- Clade: Angiosperms
- Clade: Monocots
- Order: Asparagales
- Family: Orchidaceae
- Subfamily: Orchidoideae
- Tribe: Diurideae
- Genus: Acianthus
- Species: †A. ledwardii

Binomial name
- †Acianthus ledwardii Rupp

Species of flowering plant

Acianthus ledwardii was a species of flowering plant in the orchid family Orchidaceae and was endemic to Queensland in Australia but is now presumed extinct. It was a terrestrial herb with a single, heart-shaped leaf and between 2 and 6 transparent, reddish brown flowers.

== Description ==
Acianthus ledwardii was a terrestrial, perennial, deciduous, sympodial herb with a single heart-shaped, glabrous, pale green leaf that was reddish-purple on its lower surface. Each plant had between 2 and 6 deep purplish or reddish brown flowers on a thin raceme up to 50 mm (2.0 in) tall. The flowers were similar to those of the more common Acianthus fornicatus, but the dorsal sepal narrowed abruptly rather than gradually tapered, the lateral sepals had three points on the tip, the petals were broader than those of A. fornicatus, and the labellum was convex on the lower surface, rather than concave.

== Taxonomy and naming ==
Acianthus ledwardii was first formally described in 1938 by Herman Rupp and the description was published in The Queensland Naturalist from specimens collected by "Dr. C.P. Ledward" near Burleigh Heads in 1934.

== Distribution ==
This orchid is only known from collections made in 1934 and 1938 from Burleigh Heads.

== Conservation ==
Acianthus ledwardii is listed as "extinct" under the Australian Government Environment Protection and Biodiversity Conservation Act 1999.
