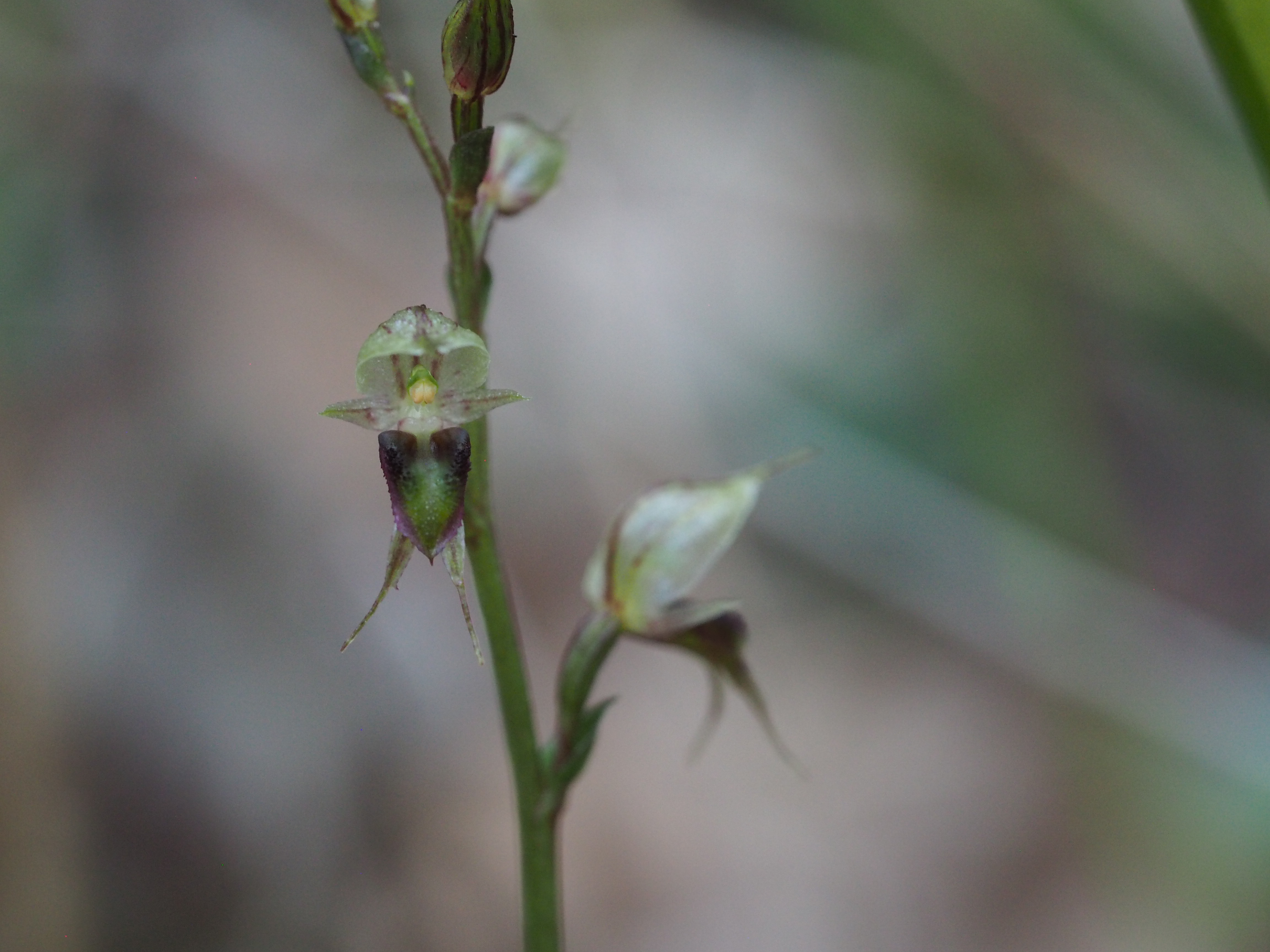
- Acianthus exiguus near Repton

Scientific classification
- Kingdom: Plantae
- Clade: Tracheophytes
- Clade: Angiosperms
- Clade: Monocots
- Order: Asparagales
- Family: Orchidaceae
- Subfamily: Orchidoideae
- Tribe: Diurideae
- Genus: Acianthus
- Species: A. exiguus

Binomial name
- Acianthus exiguus D.L.Jones

= Acianthus exiguus =

Tiny mosquito orchid

Species of flowering plant

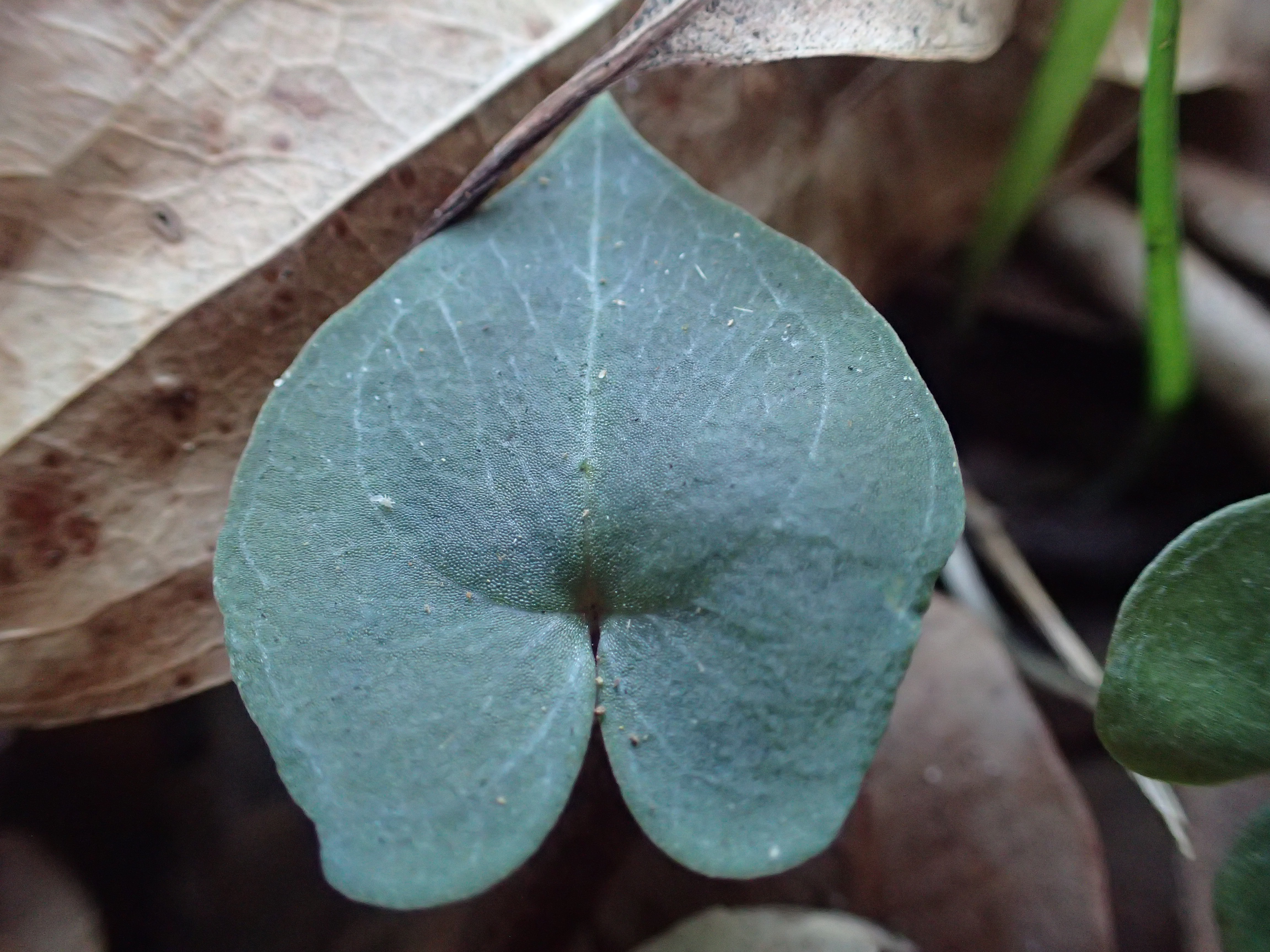
Leaf

Acianthus exiguus, commonly known as tiny mosquito orchid, is a species of flowering plant in the orchid family Orchidaceae and is endemic to New South Wales, Australia. It is a terrestrial herb with a single, heart-shaped leaf and up to five translucent greenish-white flowers with pinkish markings and is found growing in forests on the north coast of the state.

== Description ==
Acianthus exiguus is a terrestrial, perennial, deciduous, sympodial herb with a single heart-shaped, glabrous, dark green leaf which is light reddish-purple on its lower surface. The leaf is 18–30 mm (0.7–1 in) long, 15–20 mm (0.6–0.8 in) wide on a stalk 2–5 cm (0.8–2 in) high.

There are up to five flowers well-spaced on a thin raceme 6–10 cm (2–4 in) tall, each flower 5–7 mm (0.2–0.3 in) long. The dorsal sepal is oval to elliptic in shape, 4–5 mm (0.2–0.2 in) long, 3–3.5 mm (0.12–0.14 in) wide, translucent greenish-white with faint red markings and forms a hood over the column. The central vein extends about 1.5 mm (0.06 in) beyond the end of the labellum. The lateral sepals are 6–7 mm (0.2–0.3 in) long, about 0.7 mm (0.03 in) wide, linear to lance-shaped, often have a curved tip, are similar in colour to the dorsal sepal and project forwards below the labellum. The petals are a similar colour and are about 2.0–2.5 mm (0.08–0.1 in) long, narrow egg-shaped to lance-shaped and usually spread widely. The labellum is pink to pinkish-mauve, 3.5–4.0 mm (0.14–0.16 in) wide, about 2 mm (0.08 in) wide, with the edges not rolled and lacking teeth. The thick, fleshy callus covering most of the central area is green and has many small pimple-like papillae on the outer half. Flowering occurs from May to June.

This species is distinguished from other mosquito orchids by its small, greenish, semi-erect flowers and narrow, purplish labellum.

== Taxonomy and naming ==
Acianthus exiguus was first formally described by David Jones in 1991 and the description was published in Australian Orchid Research from specimens found near Wardell. The specific epithet (exiguus) is a Latin word meaning "small", "little" or "petty". In a 1995 paper published in the journal Allertonia, Paul Kores claimed that A. exiguus and 3 other species are not distinct from A. fornicatus and should be regarded as a synonyms. That position has been adopted by Plants of the World Online.

== Ecology ==
The flowers of this species, unlike those of other mosquito orchids, are self-pollinating.

== Distribution and habitat ==
This orchid grows in localised populations between Repton and Wardell in the North Coast region of New South Wales. It grows in sandy soil and clay loam in tall, moist forest and rainforest.

== Conservation ==
Acianthus exiguus has a ROTAP rating of 3RC-, indicating that it is uncommon.
