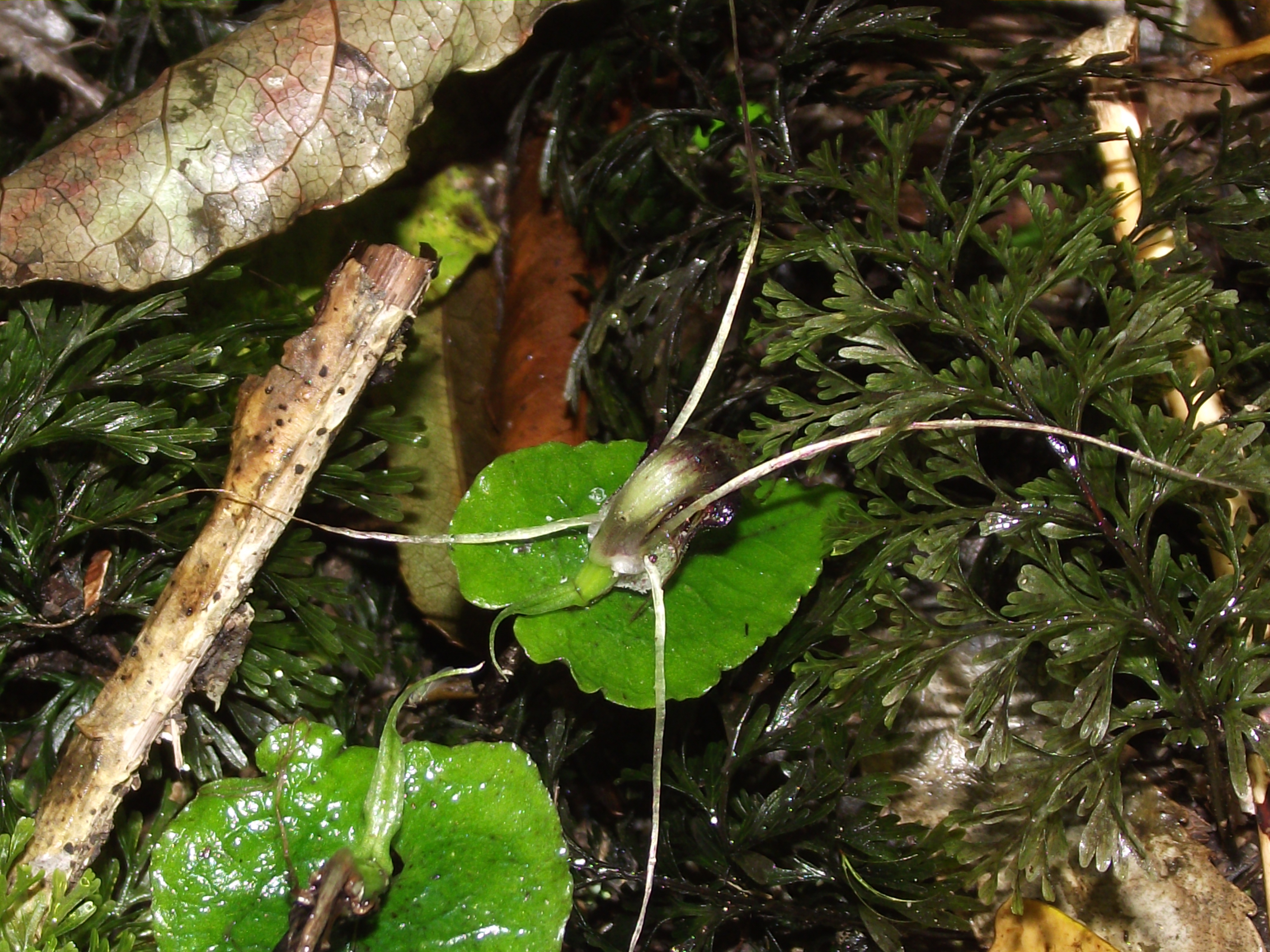
- Corybas acuminatus on Maungatautari

Scientific classification
- Kingdom: Plantae
- Clade: Tracheophytes
- Clade: Angiosperms
- Clade: Monocots
- Order: Asparagales
- Family: Orchidaceae
- Subfamily: Orchidoideae
- Tribe: Diurideae
- Genus: Corybas
- Species: C. acuminatus

Binomial name
- Corybas acuminatus M.A.Clem. & Hatch

Synonyms
- Corysanthes acuminata (M.A.Clem. & Hatch) Szlach.; Nematoceras acuminatum (M.A.Clem. & Hatch) Molloy, D.L.Jones & M.A.Clem.

= Corybas acuminatus =

Dancing spider orchid

Species of orchid

Corybas acuminatus, commonly known as the dancing spider orchid or helmet flower, is a species of terrestrial orchid endemic to New Zealand. It has a triangular, sharply pointed leaf and a small translucent, greenish-white flower with purple markings and with very long sepals. It is found on both the main islands of New Zealand and also some of the off-shore islands.

== Description ==
Corybas acuminatus is a terrestrial, perennial, deciduous, herb with a single triangular to heart-shaped leaf up to 40 mm (2 in) long and 20 mm (0.8 in) wide with a sharply pointed tip. The leaf is light green on the upper surface and silvery with red veins on the lower side. A single more or less translucent flower with dull red striations arises directly above the leaf. The largest part of the flower is the dorsal sepal which is up to 40 mm (2 in) long with a long, horizontal, thread-like tip. The lateral sepals are erect, thread-like and are up to 60 mm (2 in) longer than the flower. The petals are similar to the lateral sepals although smaller and are held horizontally or turn downwards. The labellum is red and creamy green and has two rounded ear-like shapes near its base. Flowering occurs from August to December.

When not in flower, Corybas acuminatus may be confused with the leaves of Acianthus sinclairii, which shares its heart-shaped leaf with a pointed apex and maroon veinlike patterning. However, the latter's veining appears embossed, whereas that of C. acuminatus appears to be within the leaf; moreover, the leaves of A. sinclairii are thicker and leathery and do not have undulated borders, unlike C. acuminatus. C. acuminatus may also occasionally be confused with Corybas oblongus individuals with more pointed leaves, since both species have maroon-patterned leaves; however, in flower, they may be readily distinguished.

== Taxonomy ==
Corybas acuminatus was first formally described in 1991 by Mark Clements and Edwin Hatch from a specimen collected near Karekare and the description was published in the New Zealand Journal of Botany. The specific epithet (acuminatus) is a Latin word meaning "pointed" or "sharpened", referring to the shape of the leaf of this orchid.

In 2002, David Jones and Mark Clements proposed splitting Corybas into smaller genera and placing this species into Nematoceras but the change has not been widely accepted.

== Distribution and habitat ==
Dancing spider orchid grows in moist, shady forests. It occurs on the North, South, Stewart, Chatham and Auckland Islands.

== Conservation ==
Corybas acuminatus is classified as "not threatened" by the New Zealand Government Department of Conservation.
