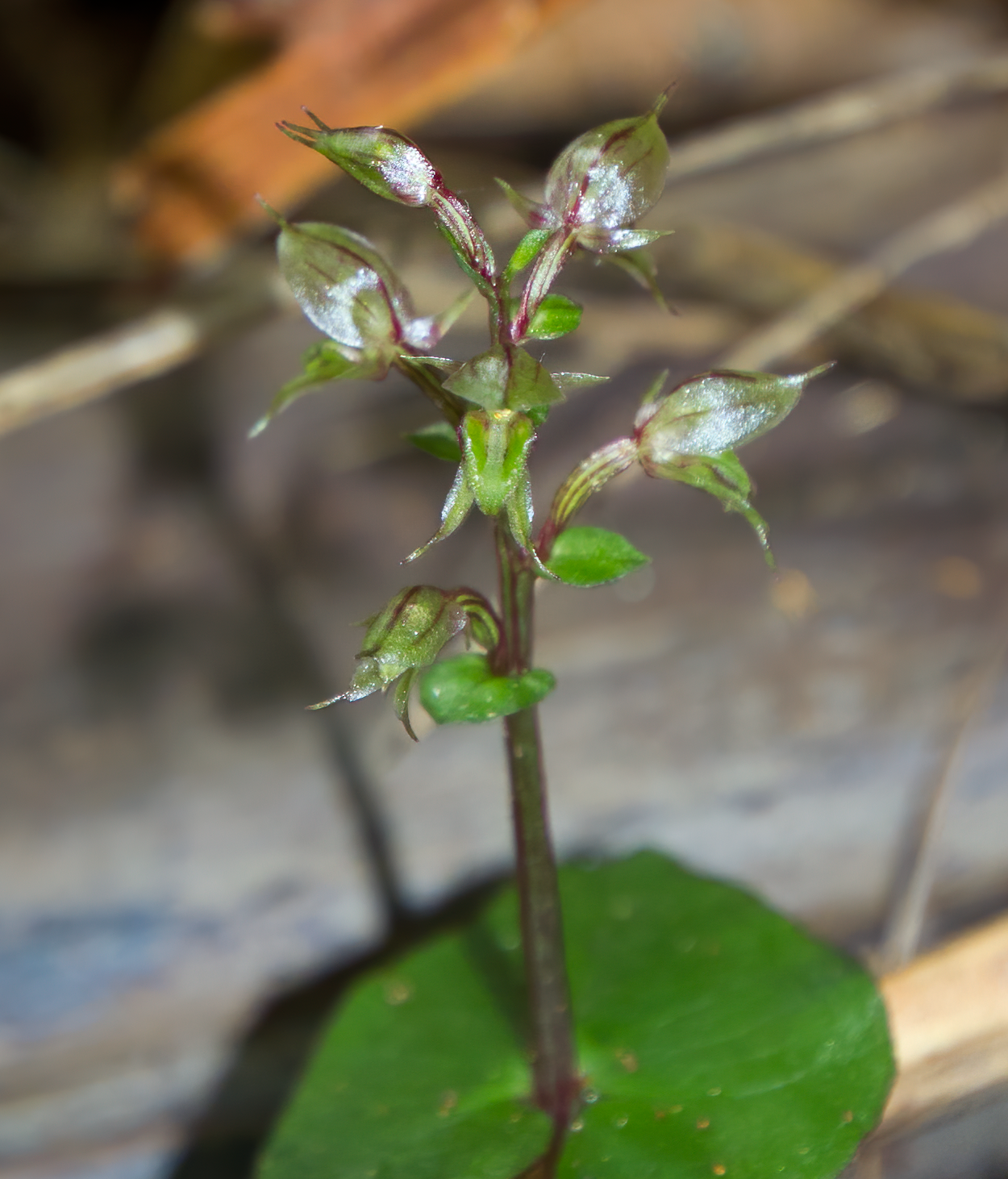
- In Kaimai Mamaku Conservation Park, New Zealand

Scientific classification
- Kingdom: Plantae
- Clade: Tracheophytes
- Clade: Angiosperms
- Clade: Monocots
- Order: Asparagales
- Family: Orchidaceae
- Subfamily: Orchidoideae
- Tribe: Diurideae
- Genus: Acianthus
- Species: A. sinclairii

Binomial name
- Acianthus sinclairii Hook.f.

Synonyms
- Acianthus fornicatus var. sinclairii (Hook.f.) Hatch

= Acianthus sinclairii =

Pixie caps

Species of flowering plant

Acianthus sinclairii, commonly known as pixie cap or heart-leaf orchid, is a flowering plant in the orchid family Orchidaceae and is endemic to New Zealand. It is a terrestrial herb with a single, heart-shaped leaf and up to ten translucent green flowers, usually tinged maroon.

== Description ==
Acianthus sinclairii is a terrestrial, perennial, deciduous, sympodial herb with a single heart-shaped, glabrous, dark green leaf which often has a maroon tinge or markings. The leaf is 10–30 mm (0.4–1 in) long, one-quarter to halfway up the slender stem, which is about 100 mm (4 in) long at flowering but increases later.

There are up to ten flowers, 6–8 mm (0.2–0.3 in) long, green but with purple blotches and a dull red labellum. The dorsal sepal is broadly lance-shaped to egg-shaped and forms a hood over the column. The lateral sepals are similar in length to the dorsal sepal but have a pointed end and face forward beneath the labellum. The petals are somewhat shorter than the sepals, are lance-shaped and spread widely. The labellum is also shorter than the sepals, dished, broadly egg-shaped with the edges turned under, dull red with two rounded calli at its base. Flowering occurs between January and October.

== Taxonomy and naming ==
Acianthus sinclairii was first formally described in 1853 by Joseph Dalton Hooker and the description was published in The Botany of the Antarctic Voyage of H.M. Discovery Ships Erebus and Terror in the years 1839–1843, under the Command of Captain Sir James Clark Ross. Hooker noted that this species is similar to Acianthus fornicatus "but differs in the lip [labellum] being less glandular". The specific epithet (sinclairii) honours Andrew Sinclair, a Scottish botanist and friend of Hooker.

== Distribution and habitat ==
This orchid usually grows in shaded shrubland and forest, only rarely in sunny habitat but often near streams or moist areas. It occurs on both the North Island and South Island as well as on Stewart and Chatham Islands and on Raoul Island in the Kermadec Group.

== Conservation ==
Acianthus sinclairii is common and classified as "not threatened".
