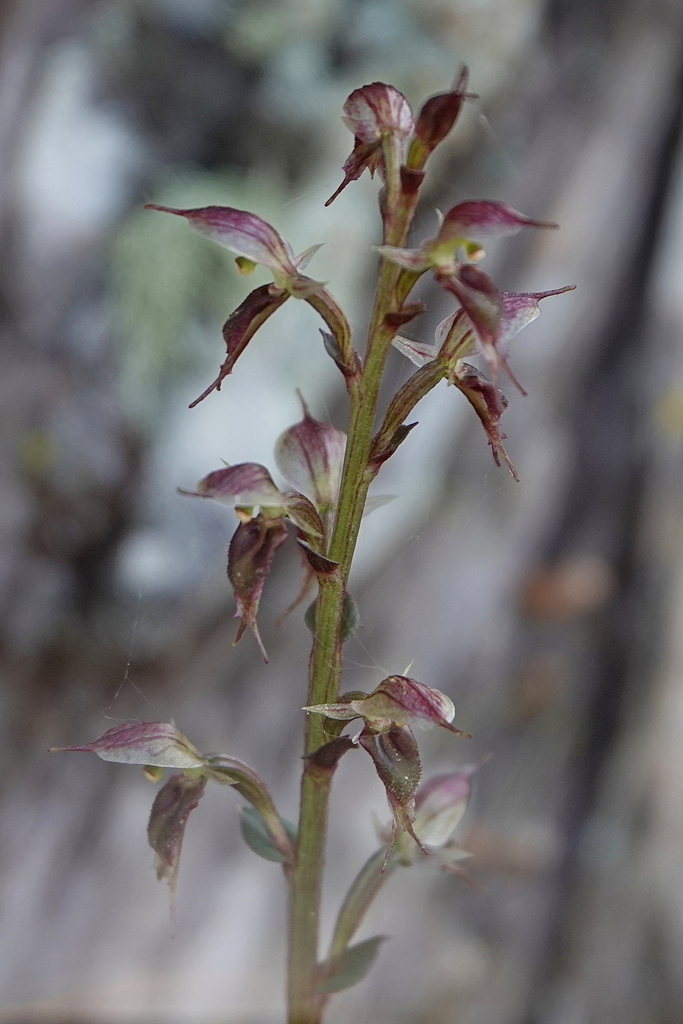

Scientific classification
- Kingdom: Plantae
- Clade: Embryophytes
- Clade: Tracheophytes
- Clade: Angiosperms
- Clade: Monocots
- Order: Asparagales
- Family: Orchidaceae
- Subfamily: Orchidoideae
- Tribe: Diurideae
- Genus: Acianthus
- Species: A. scopulus

Binomial name
- Acianthus scopulus D.L.Jones

= Acianthus scopulus =

Species of flowering plant

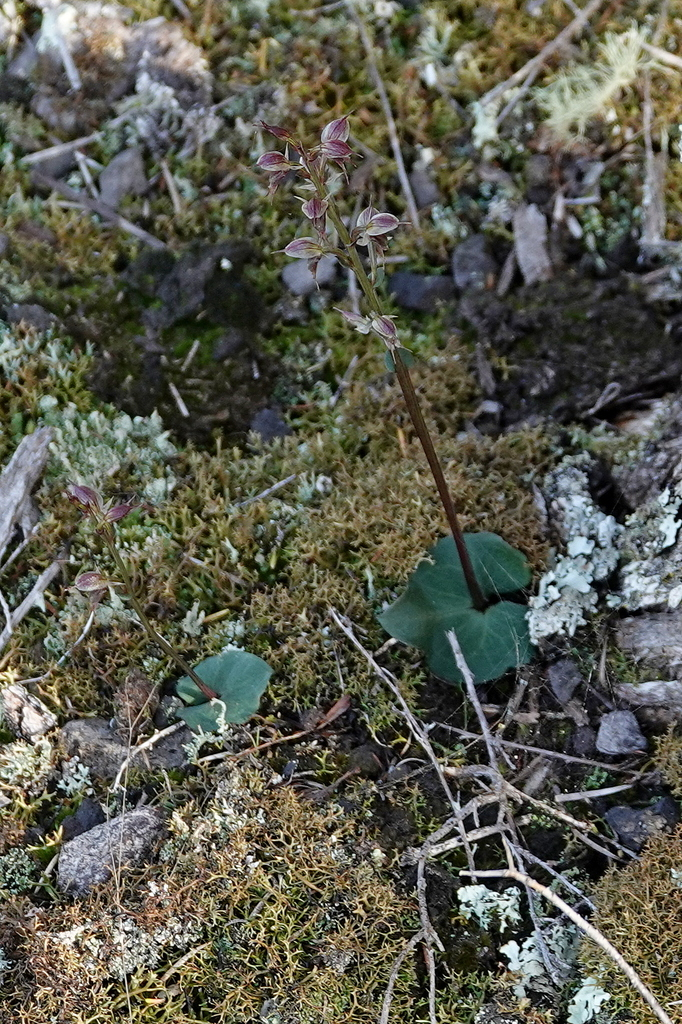
Whole plant

Acianthus scopulus is a species of flowering plant in the orchid family Orchidaceae and is endemic to New South Wales, Australia. It is a glabrous, terrestrial herb with a single heart-shaped leaf and usually up to six translucent pinkish flowers with dark pink to reddish markings.

== Description ==
Acianthus scopulus is a glabrous, terrestrial, tuberous herb that grows in small colonies. It has a stalk 10–20 mm (0.39–0.79 in) tall and a single heart-shaped leaf 10–20 mm (0.39–0.79 in) long and 8–15 mm (0.31–0.59 in) wide. The leaf is dark green on the upper surface and purplish on the lower side. There are up to 6 translucent pink flowers 6–7 mm (0.24–0.28 in) long on a slender, pinkish raceme 50–90 mm (2.0–3.5 in) tall with an egg-shaped floral bracts about 3 mm (0.12 in) long and wide. The dorsal sepal is egg-shaped, 6–7 mm (0.24–0.28 in) long, 2–3 mm (0.079–0.118 in) wide and a hood over the column. The lateral sepals are 5.5–6.5 mm (0.22–0.26 in) long and 1 mm (0.039 in) wide, the petals egg-shaped and curved, 2.5–3.0 mm (0.098–0.118 in) long and about 1 mm (0.039 in) wide and translucent pinkish with a red stripe in the centre. The labellum is curved down, more or less wedge-shaped, 4.0–4.5 mm (0.16–0.18 in) long and 2–3 mm (0.079–0.118 in) wide, the callus appearing rough or wrinkled. Flowering occurs from May to June.

This species is distinguished from others in the genus by its shorter, very slender habit, smaller leaves and much smaller flowers

== Taxonomy and naming ==
Acianthus scopulus was first formally described in 2019 by David L. Jones in Australian Orchid Review from specimens collected near Tathra in 1992. The specific epithet (scopulus) means "'crag, cliff edge or projecting rock', referring to its habitat on coastal headlands".

== Distribution ==
This orchid is only known from coastal headland overlooking the ocean near Tathra.

== Conservation status ==
Acianthus scopulus is currently known from fewer than 150 plants, growing in small colonies.
