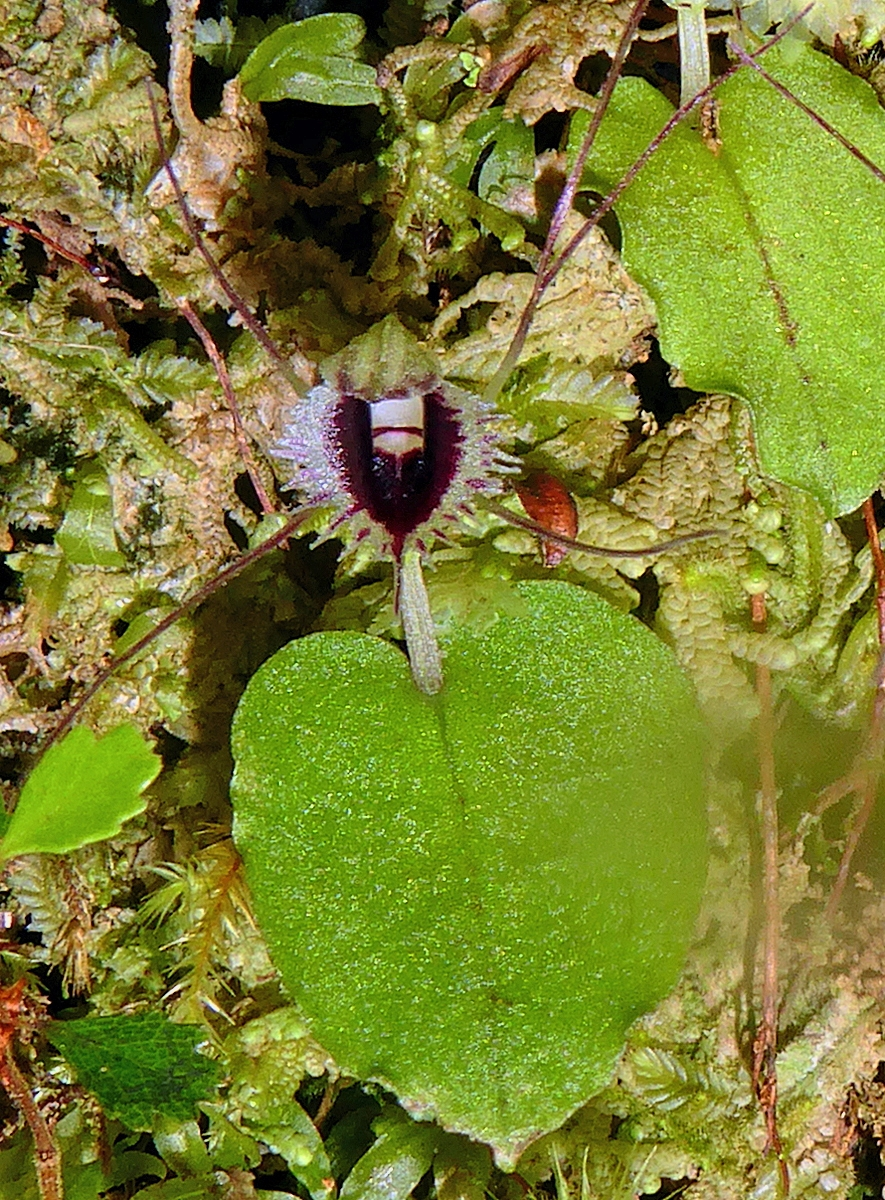

Scientific classification
- Kingdom: Plantae
- Clade: Tracheophytes
- Clade: Angiosperms
- Clade: Monocots
- Order: Asparagales
- Family: Orchidaceae
- Subfamily: Orchidoideae
- Tribe: Diurideae
- Genus: Corybas
- Species: C. oblongus

Binomial name
- Corybas oblongus (Hook.f.) Rchb.f.

Synonyms
- Nematoceras oblongum Hook.f.; Corysanthes oblonga (Hook.f.) Hook.f.; Singularybas oblongus (Hook.f.) Molloy, D.L.Jones & M.A.Clem.

= Corybas oblongus =

Species of orchid

Corybas oblongus is a species of terrestrial orchid endemic to New Zealand. It has a solitary oval-shaped leaf, often patterned with maroon, and a reddish-purple and white flower with a fimbriate labellum.

== Description ==
Corybas oblongus is a terrestrial, perennial herb with a single distinctively oval-shaped sessile leaf that is 10–40 mm long. The leaf often has slightly undulated edges and characteristic maroon patterning, which may appear as flecks or veining. The leaf is green on the upper surface and silvery red or silvery green on the lower surface. The dorsal sepal is slightly longer than the labellum and forms a hood over the lip and is broad at the apex; it ranges from white (rarely) to pale green, flecked with purple or red. The lateral sepals range from crystalline white to maroon and are long and filiform (thread-like). The petals resemble the lateral sepals but are slightly shorter. The labellum faces horizontally or is tilted slightly upwards and is 5–10 mm long. It is curved at its base, forming a cylindrical opening with a flared, highly fimbriate (toothed) mouth. The surface of the posterior half of the labellum has many hair-like structures that are curved backwards. Flowering occurs from September to February. The capsule is borne on a peduncle that elongates after flowering, like several other Corybas species.

When not in flower, Corybas oblongus may be occasionally confused with the leaves of Corybas acuminatus, which also has undulated margins and maroon patterning that ranges from flecking to veining. Generally, the two can be distinguished because C. acuminatus has heart-shaped leaves with sharply pointed apices; however, flowers may be required to identify individuals with weakly pointed leaves. The only species that shares a fimbriate labellum is Corybas cryptanthus; however, this species is leafless and lacks chlorophyll.

== Taxonomy ==
Corybas oblongus was first formally described in 1853 by Joseph Hooker and given the name Nematoceras oblongum. The specific epithet (oblongus) is a Latin word meaning "oblong" and refers to the oblong-ovate shape of the leaf. The description was published in Hooker's Flora Novae-Zelandiae. In 1864, Hooker changed its name to Corysanthes oblonga. In 1871, Heinrich Reichenbach changed its name to Corybas oblongus. In 2002, Brian Molloy, David Jones, and Mark Clements proposed changing C. oblongus to Singularybas oblongus; however, the change has not been accepted by the World Checklist of Selected Plant Families.

== Distribution and habitat ==
Corybas oblongus grows in coastal and subalpine habitats up to 1200 m above sea level, including shrubland, forests and peat bogs. It occurs on both the North Island and the South Island, as well as the Chatham Islands and the Antipodean Islands.
