= Townsonia viridis =

Beech orchid

Scientific classification
- Kingdom: Plantae
- Clade: Tracheophytes
- Clade: Angiosperms
- Clade: Monocots
- Order: Asparagales
- Family: Orchidaceae
- Subfamily: Orchidoideae
- Tribe: Diurideae
- Genus: Townsonia
- Species: T. viridis

Binomial name
- Townsonia viridis (Hook.f.) Schltr.

Synonyms
- Acianthus viridis Hook.f.

Species of orchid

Townsonia viridis, commonly known as beech orchid, is a species of orchid endemic to Tasmania. It forms diffuse colonies with tiny, inconspicuous flowers and small, more or less round leaves and grows mainly in mossy places in myrtle beech forest.

== Description ==
Townsonia viridis is a terrestrial, perennial, deciduous, sympodial herbs which grows in small groups with the tubers connected by a fleshy root. It spreads through mossy patches and leaf litter. Each tuber produces one or two leaves. Both flowering and non-flowering plants have an erect, very thin leaf emerging at ground level. These leaves are pale green to yellowish and have wavy margins. They are 6–15 mm (0.2–0.6 in) long and 5–8 mm (0.2–0.3 in) wide with a petiole 30–50 mm (1–2 in) long. Flowering plants also have a similar leaf on the flowering stem except that it lacks a petiole and is well above ground level. Up to four flowers 5–7 mm (0.2–0.3 in) long and 6–8 mm (0.2–0.3 in) wide are borne on a brittle, fleshy flowering stem 50–150 mm (2–6 in) high. The flowers are green with red blotches. The dorsal sepal is 6.5–8 mm (0.26–0.31 in) long, about 4 mm (0.2 in) wide and forms a hood over the column. The lateral sepals are a similar length to the dorsal sepal but only half as wide. The petals are about 2.5 mm (0.1 in) long, 1 mm (0.04 in) wide and spread apart from each other. The labellum is a broad egg shape, 5–6 mm (0.20–0.24 in) long and wide, folded lengthwise with the tip turned downwards. Flowering occurs from November to January.

== Taxonomy and naming ==
The beech orchid was first formally described in 1906 by Joseph Dalton Hooker who gave it the name Acianthus viridis and published the description in Flora Antarctica. In 1911 Rudolf Schlechter changed the name to Townsonia viridis. The specific epithet (viridis) is a Latin word meaning "green".

== Distribution and habitat ==
Beech orchid grows in permanently wet forests, especially those of myrtle beech. It is found mainly on the west coast of Tasmania.
