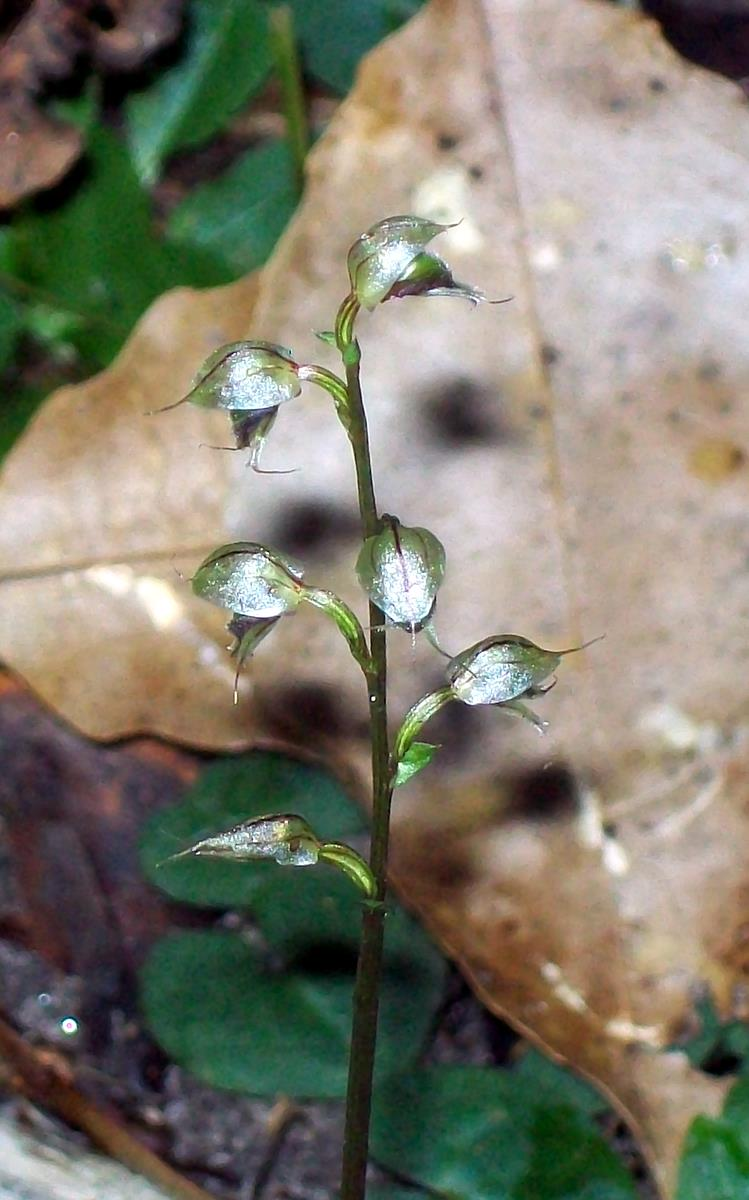
- Acianthus fornicatus

Scientific classification
- Kingdom: Plantae
- Clade: Tracheophytes
- Clade: Angiosperms
- Clade: Monocots
- Order: Asparagales
- Family: Orchidaceae
- Subfamily: Orchidoideae
- Tribe: Diurideae
- Subtribe: Acianthinae; Schltr. Bot. Jahrb. Syst. (1911)

Genera
- Acianthus; Corybas; Cyrtostylis; Stigmatodactylus; Townsonia

= Acianthinae =

Subtribe of flowering plants

Acianthinae is an orchid subtribe in the tribe Diurideae.

== See also ==
- Taxonomy of the Orchidaceae
