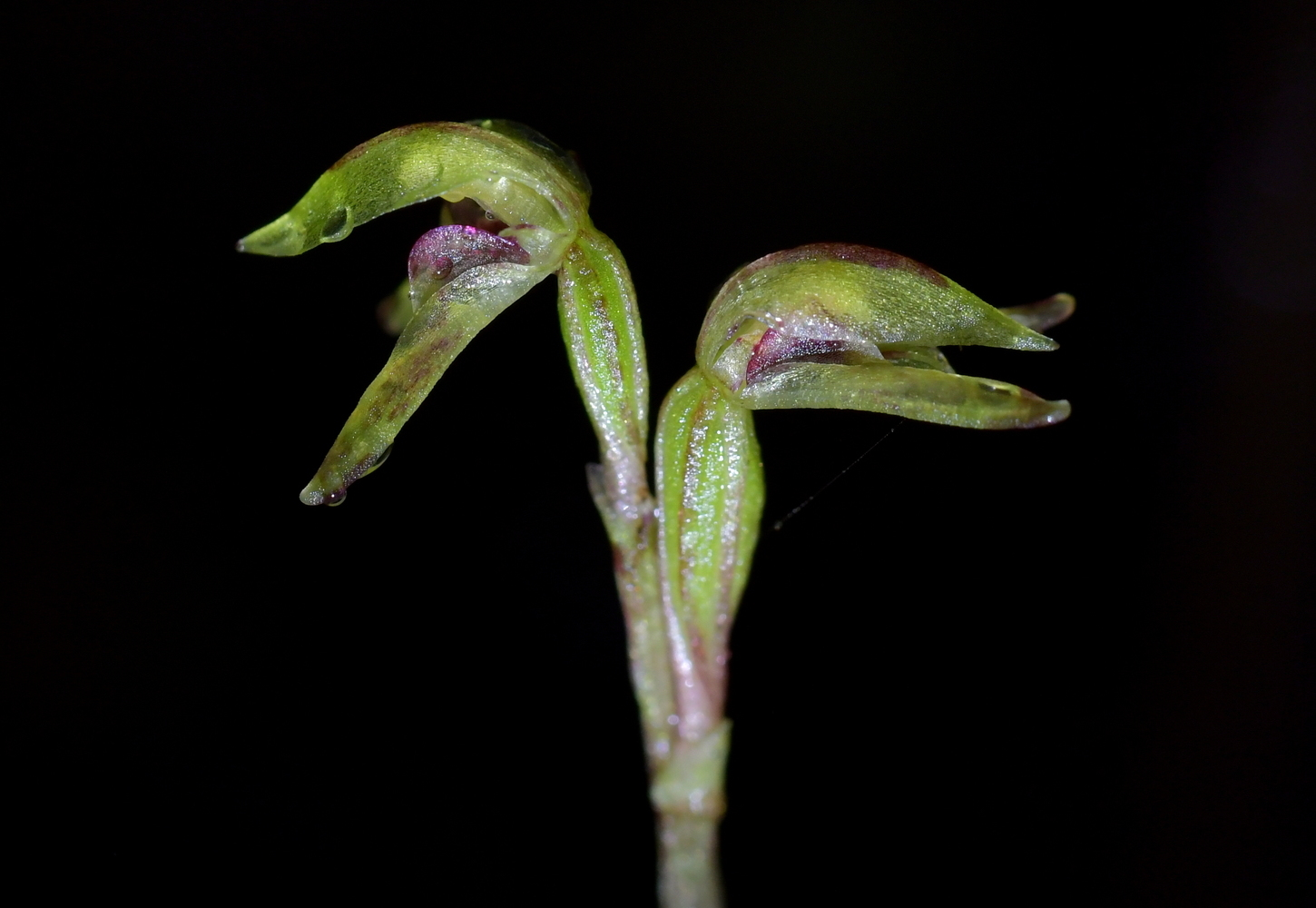

Scientific classification
- Kingdom: Plantae
- Clade: Tracheophytes
- Clade: Angiosperms
- Clade: Monocots
- Order: Asparagales
- Family: Orchidaceae
- Subfamily: Orchidoideae
- Tribe: Diurideae
- Genus: Townsonia
- Species: T. deflexa

Binomial name
- Townsonia deflexa Cheeseman, 1906

= Townsonia deflexa =

Creeping forest orchid

Species of orchid

Townsonia deflexa, commonly known as the creeping forest orchid, is a species of orchid endemic to New Zealand. It forms diffuse colonies with tiny, inconspicuous flowers and small, more or less round leaves and grows mainly in mossy places in beech forest.

== Description ==
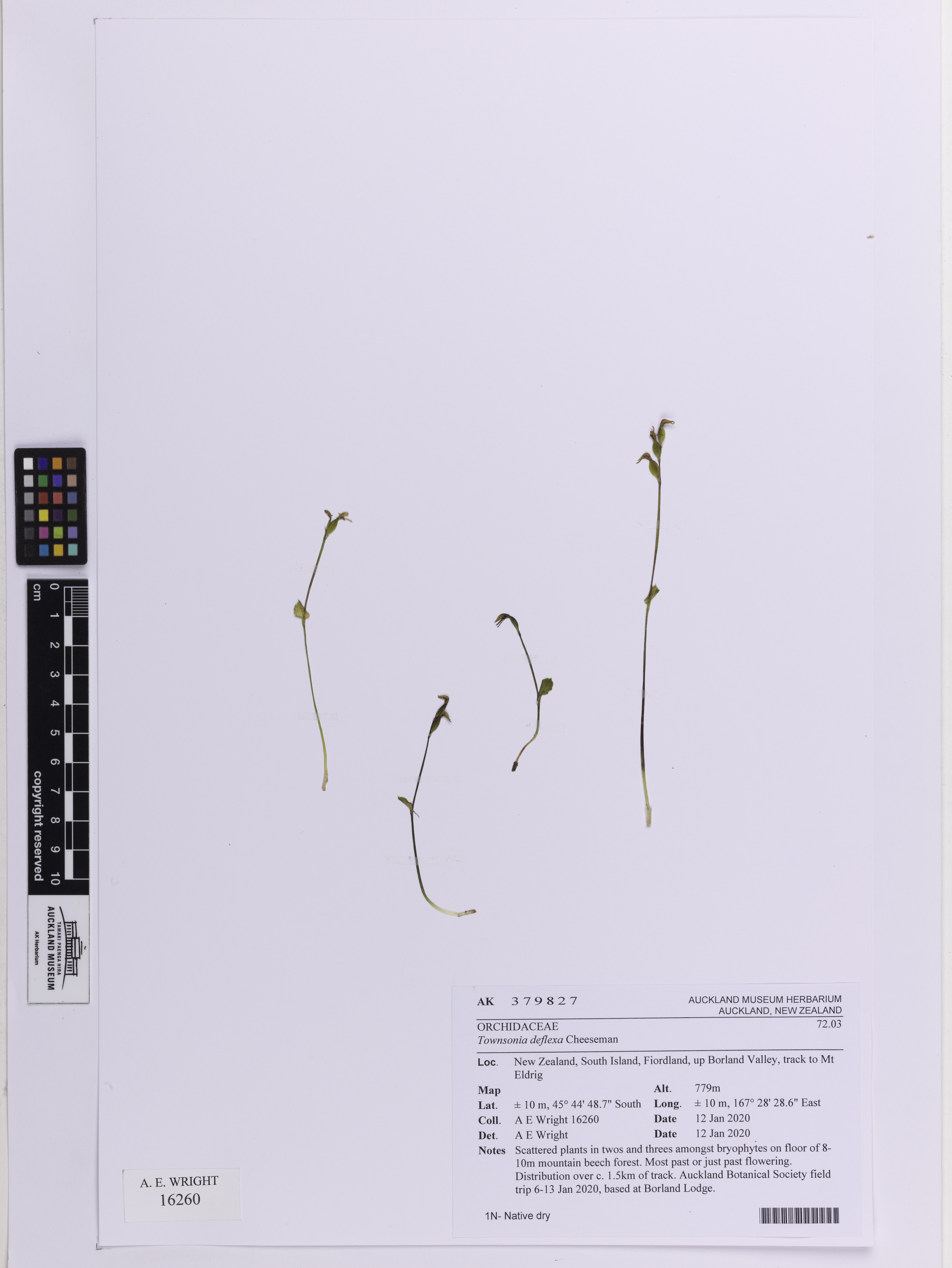
Herbarium specimen of Townsonia deflexa

Townsonia deflexa is a terrestrial, perennial, deciduous, sympodial herb which grows in small groups with its tubers connected by a fleshy root. It spreads through mossy patches and leaf litter, each tuber producing one or two leaves. The leaves of both flowering and non-flowering plants are very thin with wavy margins and a relatively long petiole. The leaves emerge at ground level and are egg-shaped to almost round, and about 10 mm (0.4 in) long. Flowering plants also have a similar leaf on the flowering stem except that it lacks a petiole. Up to four flowers about 4 mm (0.2 in) long are borne on a flowering stem 10–20 mm (0.4–0.8 in) high. The flowers are green with red blotches. The sepals are V-shaped in cross section, the dorsal sepal broader and slightly shorter than the lateral sepals. The petals are erect, oblong and much shorter than the sepals. The labellum is also shorter than the sepals and is thicker along its mid-line with two ridges of calli. Flowering occurs from November to February.

== Taxonomy and naming ==
Townsonia deflexa was first formally described in 1906 by Thomas Cheeseman and the description was published in his book Manual of the New Zealand Flora. The specific epithet (deflexa) is a Latin word meaning "bending away from".

== Distribution and habitat ==
The creeping forest orchid grows in mossy placed, especially in beech forests, forming small diffuse colonies. It is found on the North, South, Stewart, Auckland and Campbell Islands of New Zealand.
