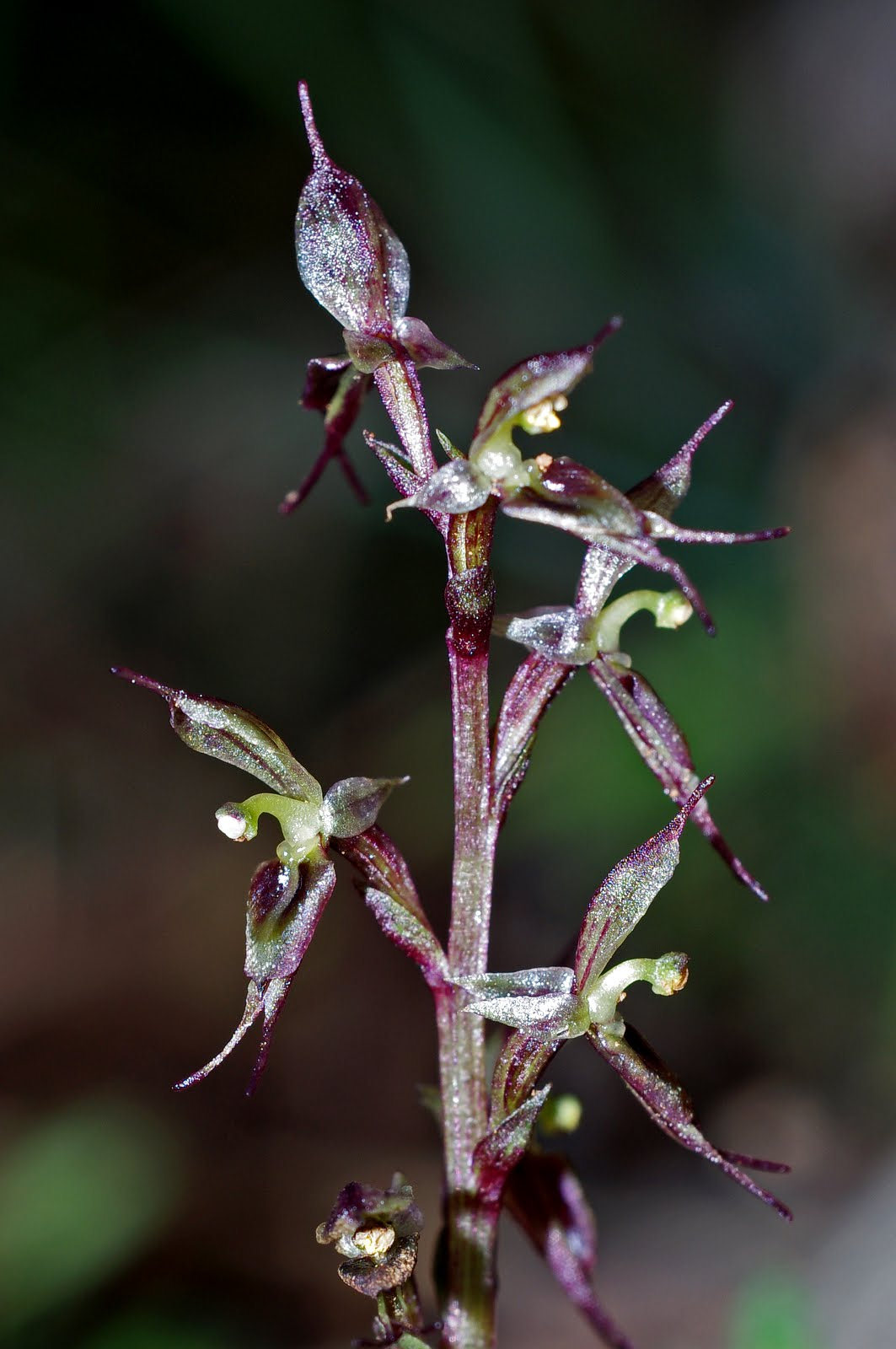
- Acianthus exsertus

Scientific classification
- Kingdom: Plantae
- Clade: Tracheophytes
- Clade: Angiosperms
- Clade: Monocots
- Order: Asparagales
- Family: Orchidaceae
- Subfamily: Orchidoideae
- Tribe: Diurideae
- Subtribe: Acianthinae
- Genus: Acianthus; R.Br.

Synonyms
- List: Acianthella D.L.Jones & M.A.Clem.; Acianthopsis M.A.Clem. & D.L.Jones; Acianthopsis Szlach. nom. illeg.; Acianthus R.Br. sect. Acianthus; Acianthus sect. Macropetalus Kores; Acianthus R.Br. subg. Acianthus; Acianthus subg. Univiscidiati Kores; Acianthus subg. Univiscidiatus Kores orth. var.; Nemacianthus D.L.Jones & M.A.Clem.; Univiscidiatus Szlach. nom. inval.; Univiscidiatus D.L.Jones, M.A.Clem., I.K.Sharma, A.M.Mack. & Molloy nom. inval.; Univiscidiatus sect. Macropetalus Szlach. nom. inval.

= Acianthus =

Genus of flowering plants

Acianthus, commonly known as mosquito orchids, is a genus of about twelve species of plants in the orchid family, Orchidaceae. Mosquito orchids are terrestrial herbs with a single, heart-shaped, usually ground-hugging leaf and one to many small, green, pinkish or purplish flowers on a fleshy stalk. They are found in New Caledonia, Australia and New Zealand.

== Description ==
Orchids in the genus Acianthus are terrestrial, perennial, deciduous, sympodial herbs with a single egg-shaped, heart-shaped or lobed leaf at the base. They have small, roughly spherical, underground tubers from which the flower stems arise. Lacking true roots, they have root-like stolons which develop "daughter" tubers at their ends. These orchids spend the dry, summer months dormant until, following late-summer or autumn rains, the leaf appears. The leaf is glabrous, sometimes ground-hugging, more usually held above the ground and is often purplish-red on the lower surface. Sometimes the leaves of plants with flowers are different from those lacking them. The leaves of all Australian species are very similar, making them hard to identify to species level in the absence of flowers.

Flowers appear in the cooler months, usually in autumn, winter or spring, There are one to many resupinate small, green, pinkish or purplish flowers 4 to 5 mm (0.16 to 0.20 in) in diameter. The flowers are held on an upright, narrow but fleshy stalk, blend in with their surrounding and often resemble mosquitoes. The sepals are longer than the petals and usually have a long, thin extension on their end. The dorsal sepal is broader than the lateral ones and sometimes forms a hood over the column. The lateral sepals project forward beneath the labellum and the petals spread widely or curve backwards against the ovary. The labellum is heart-shaped and has a prominent callus. The fruit is a thin-walled, glabrous capsule, containing a large number of winged seeds.

== Taxonomy and naming ==
The genus was first formally described by Robert Brown in 1810 in Prodromus Florae Novae Hollandiae. He described three species (A. fornicatus, A. exsertus and A. caudatus) but did not nominate a type species. Orchids in this genus are closely related to those in the genus Caladenia.

The genus name (Acianthus) is derived from the Greek ake or akis, "a point, needle" and anthos "flower" referring to the pointed perianth and the acuminate floral segments.

=== Species ===
The following is a list of Acianthus species accepted by Australian Plant Census as at March 2025, apart from A. sinclairii that is accepted by the New Zealand Plant Conservation Network:

- Acianthus apprimus D.L.Jones – early mosquito orchid (New South Wales)
- Acianthus borealis D.L.Jones – northern mosquito orchid (Queensland)
- Acianthus caudatus R.Br. – mayfly orchid (Queensland, New South Wales, Victoria, South Australia and Tasmania)
- Acianthus collinus D.L.Jones – hooded mosquito orchid (New South Wales, the Australian Capital Territory, Victoria)
- Acianthus cuneatus D.L.Jones & L.M.Copel. (New South Wales)
- Acianthus exiguus D.L.Jones – tiny mosquito orchid (New South Wales)
- Acianthus exsertus R.Br. – gnat orchid, large mosquito orchid (Queensland, New South Wales, ACT, Victoria )
- Acianthus fornicatus R.Br. – pixie-caps (Queensland, New South Wales, Victoria)
- Acianthus ledwardii Rupp – Ledward's mosquito orchid (Queensland)
- Acianthus pusillus D.L.Jones – small mosquito orchid (Queensland, New South Wales, Victoria, South Australia, Tasmania)
- Acianthus saxatilis D.L.Jones & M.A.Clem. (Queensland)
- Acianthus scopulus D.L.Jones (New South Wales)
- Acianthus sinclairii Hook.f. – heart-leaved orchid, pixie cap (New Zealand)

Plants of the World Online considers A. apprimus, A. borealis, A. collinus, A. exiguus to be synonyms of A. fornicatus.

== Distribution and habitat ==
Of the Australian species of Acianthus, 9 are found in New South Wales, 6 in Queensland, 3 in Victoria and 2 in South Australia. The sole New Zealand example, A. sinclairii occurs on both North and South Islands, as well as on Raoul, Stewart, Chatham and Three Kings Islands.

Mosquito orchids species grow in small groups in forests on decaying litter, occasionally on partially decayed logs. They sometimes form dense vegetative colonies, in sheltered forest or heathland, and are often found underneath shrubs and bracken.

== Ecology ==
The labellum of Acianthus species produces a sweet nectar which is contained in a sunken area at the base of the labellum. The flowers of Australian species open in sequence up the flowering spike, each flower open for a few days, and are pollinated by fungus gnats from the families Anisopodidae, Sciaridae and Mycetophilidae. Usually only a small percentage of the plants in a colony have flowers. Flies on Acianthus caudatus have been observed to move up the labellum, probing with their proboscis until they reach the nectar, where the up and down "pumping" action of their bodies brings them into contact with the viscidium and pollinia which then adhere to the insect's body. When these are carried to another flower, a similar action causes the pollinia to attach to the receptive stigma.

== Use in horticulture ==
Mosquito orchids are easy to grow in plastic or ceramic pots. They need to be watered regularly except when dormant over summer and to be repotted every one or two years.
