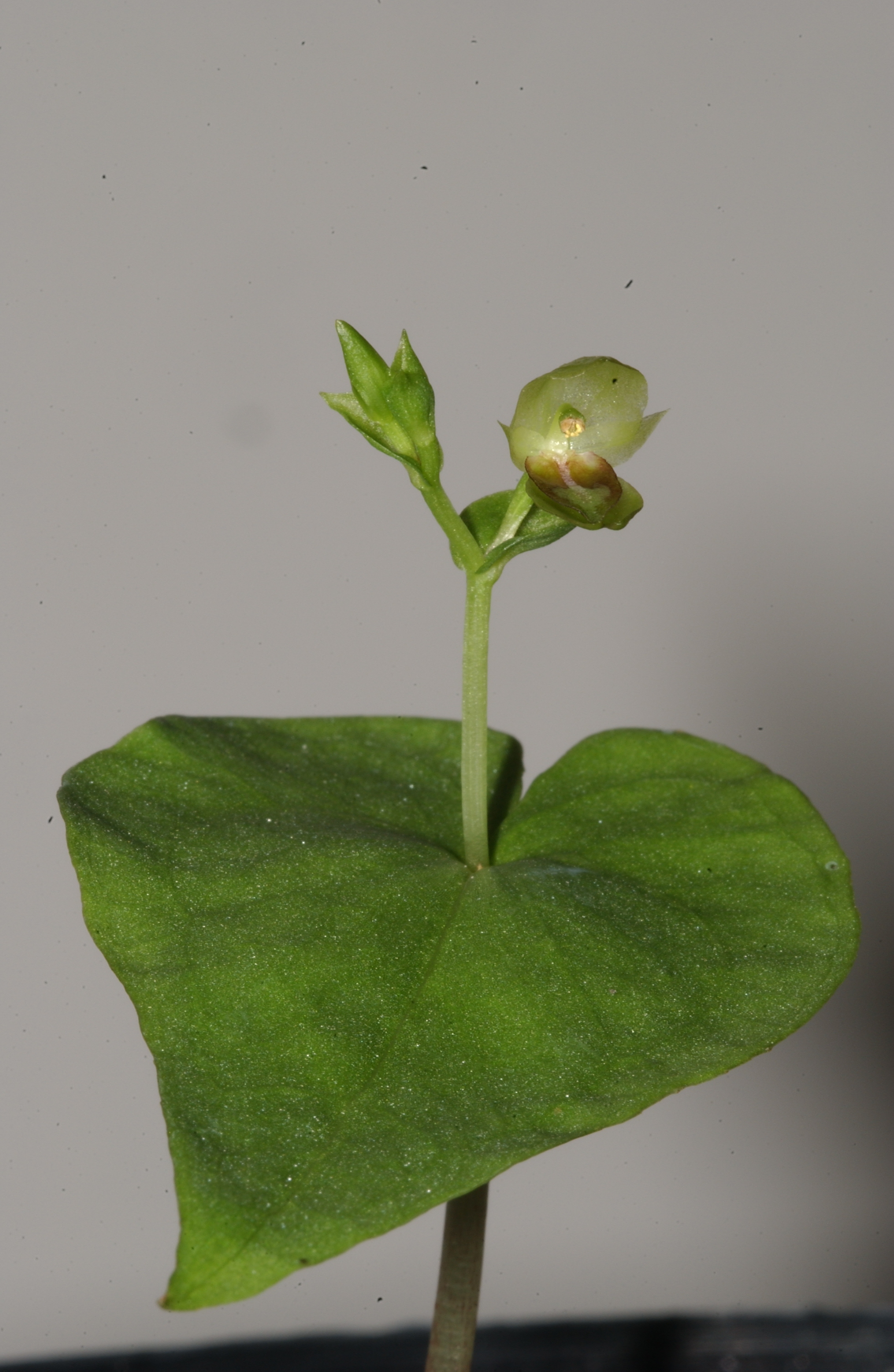

Scientific classification
- Kingdom: Plantae
- Clade: Embryophytes
- Clade: Tracheophytes
- Clade: Angiosperms
- Clade: Monocots
- Order: Asparagales
- Family: Orchidaceae
- Subfamily: Orchidoideae
- Tribe: Diurideae
- Genus: Acianthus
- Species: A. saxatilis

Binomial name
- Acianthus saxatilis D.L.Jones & M.A.Clem.

= Acianthus saxatilis =

Species of flowering plant

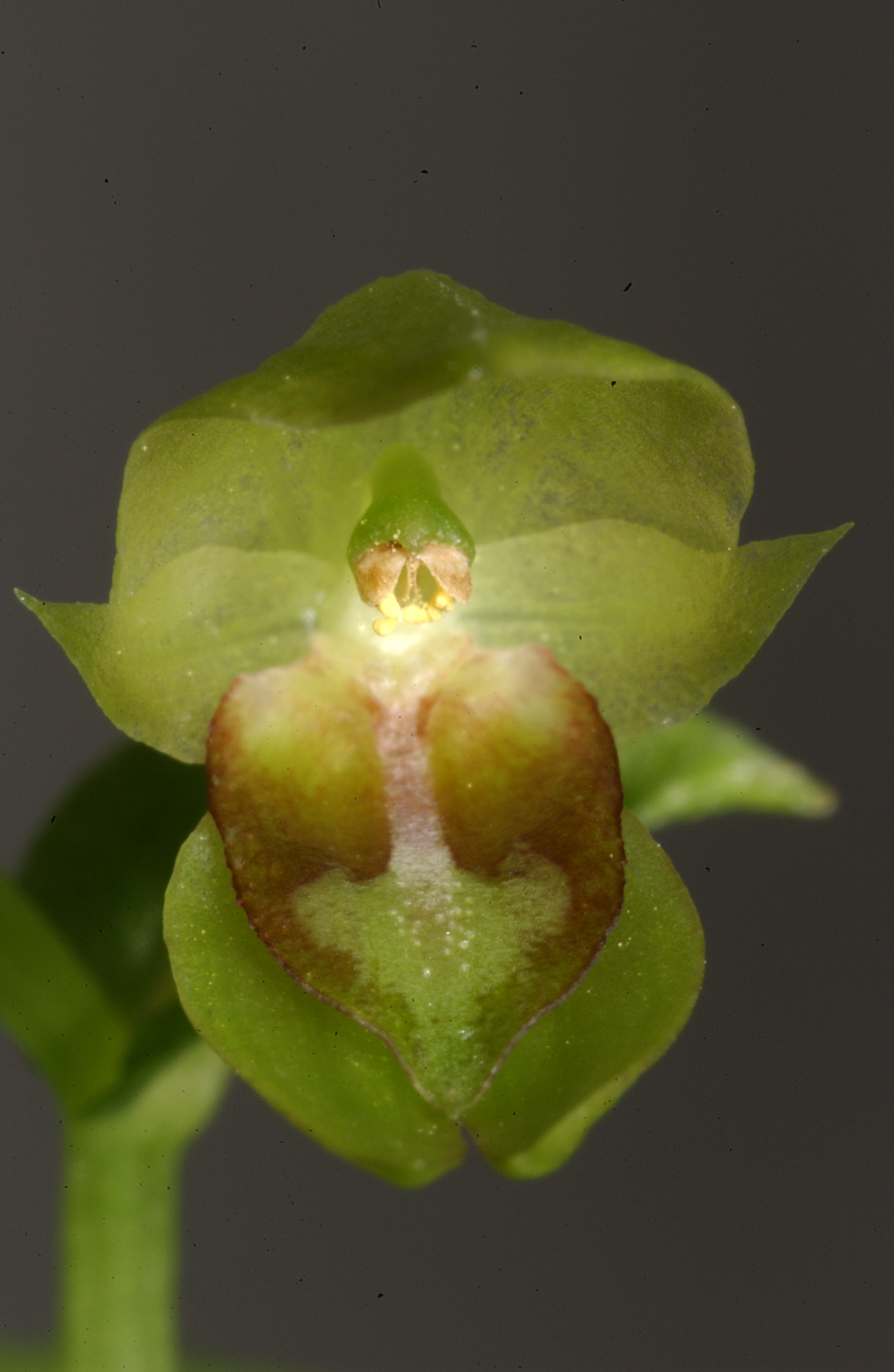
Labellum detail

Acianthus saxatilis is a species of flowering plant in the orchid family Orchidaceae and is endemic to Queensland. It is a terrestrial herb with a single, relatively large, heart-shaped leaf and usually up to 5 translucent greenish-brown to greenish-yellow flowers.

== Description ==
Acianthus saxatilis is a glabrous, terrestrial, tuberous herb that grows in small colonies. It has an erect stem 40–90 cm (16–35 in) tall and a single heart-shaped leaf 38–70 mm (1.5–2.8 in) long and 20–90 mm (0.79–3.54 in) wide. The leaf is pale green on the upper surface and reddish-green to greenish-purple on the lower side. There are usually up to 5 light green flowers 10–13 mm (0.39–0.51 in) long and 5–7 mm (0.20–0.28 in) wide on a slender raceme 30–80 mm (1.2–3.1 in) tall with prominent heart-shaped, leaf-like floral bracts 4–12 mm (0.16–0.47 in) long at the base. The dorsal sepal is egg-shaped, 8–12 mm (0.31–0.47 in) long, 4.5–8 mm (0.18–0.31 in) wide and forms a hood over the column. The lateral sepals are 9.5–14 mm (0.37–0.55 in) long and 3.0–3.5 mm (0.12–0.14 in) wide, the petals lance-shaped and curved, 7–9 mm (0.28–0.35 in) long and about 3 mm (0.12 in) wide. The labellum is 8.5–10 mm (0.33–0.39 in) long and 4.5–5.0 mm (0.18–0.20 in) wide and light greenish-brown to greenish-yellow with light brown edges, the callus with a narrow brownish band in the centre. Flowering occurs from February to May.

This species is distinguished from others in the genus by its relatively large leaf, large floral bracts and greenish and brown flowers

== Taxonomy and naming ==
Acianthus saxatilis was first formally described in 2014 by David L. Jones and Mark Alwin Clements from specimens collected near Lightning Falls in Lamington National Park in 2010 and the description was published in Australian Orchid Review. The specific epithet (saxatilis) means "dwelling amongst rocks".

== Distribution ==
This orchid is only known from two populations in the Border Ranges of south-eastern Queensland.

== Conservation ==
Acianthus saxatilis is listed as "endangered" under the Queensland Government Nature Conservation Act 1992.
