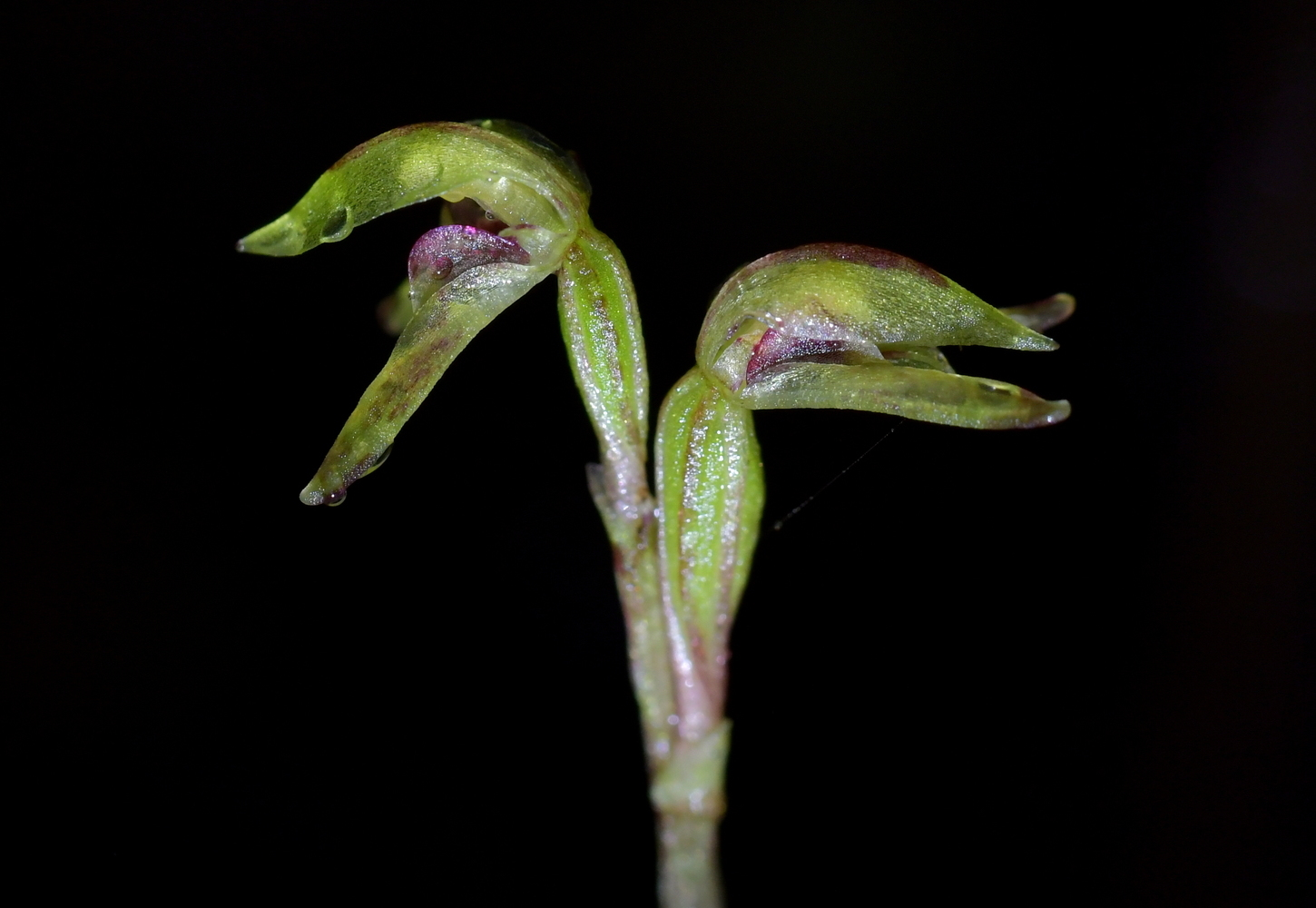
- Townsonia deflexa

Scientific classification
- Kingdom: Plantae
- Clade: Tracheophytes
- Clade: Angiosperms
- Clade: Monocots
- Order: Asparagales
- Family: Orchidaceae
- Subfamily: Orchidoideae
- Tribe: Diurideae
- Subtribe: Acianthinae
- Genus: Townsonia; Cheeseman

Type species
- Townsonia deflexa Cheeseman, 1906

= Townsonia =

Myrtle beech orchids

Genus of flowering plants

Townsonia, commonly called myrtle beech orchids is a genus of two species of flowering plants from the orchid family, Orchidaceae. They form small clusters of plants with their tubers connected, each tuber with one or two leaves. The flowers are inconspicuous.

== Description ==
Orchids in the genus Townsonia are terrestrial, perennial, deciduous, sympodial herbs which grow in small groups with their tubers connected by a fleshy root. Each tuber produces one or two leaves. The leaves are very thin with wavy margins. Those on non-flowering plants have a relatively long, fleshy petiole near ground level. Flowering plants have a similar leaf but lack a petiole, the leaf on the side of a brittle flowering stem. The flowers are small and pale coloured and have a dorsal sepal wider than the lateral sepals. The petals are much smaller than the sepals. The labellum is much different in size and shape from the petals and sepals, folded lengthwise with a narrow, ridge-like callus along the mid-line.

== Taxonomy and naming ==
Townsonia was first formally described in 1906 by Thomas Frederic Cheeseman who published the description in Manual of the New Zealand Flora. Cheeseman described T. deflexa in the same publication making it the type species. The name Townsonia honours "Mr. W. Townson, of Westport", who discovered the species.

The names of three species of Townsonia are accepted by Plants of the World Online as at August 2022:

- Townsonia apetala (Rchb.f.) M.A.Clem. & D.L.Jones (New Caledonia)
- Townsonia deflexa Cheeseman (New Zealand)
- Townsonia viridis (Hook.f.) Schltr. (Australia)

== See also ==
- List of Orchidaceae genera
