= Mount Duval (Nunavut) =

Mountain in Nunavut, Canada

Highest point
- Elevation: 850 m (2,790 ft)
- Coordinates: 66°09′N 65°38′W

Geography
- Location: Nunavut, Canada

Mount Duval is a 850 m (2,790 ft) mountain on Baffin Island, Nunavut, Canada. It is on the Pangnirtung Fiord near Pangnirtung.
