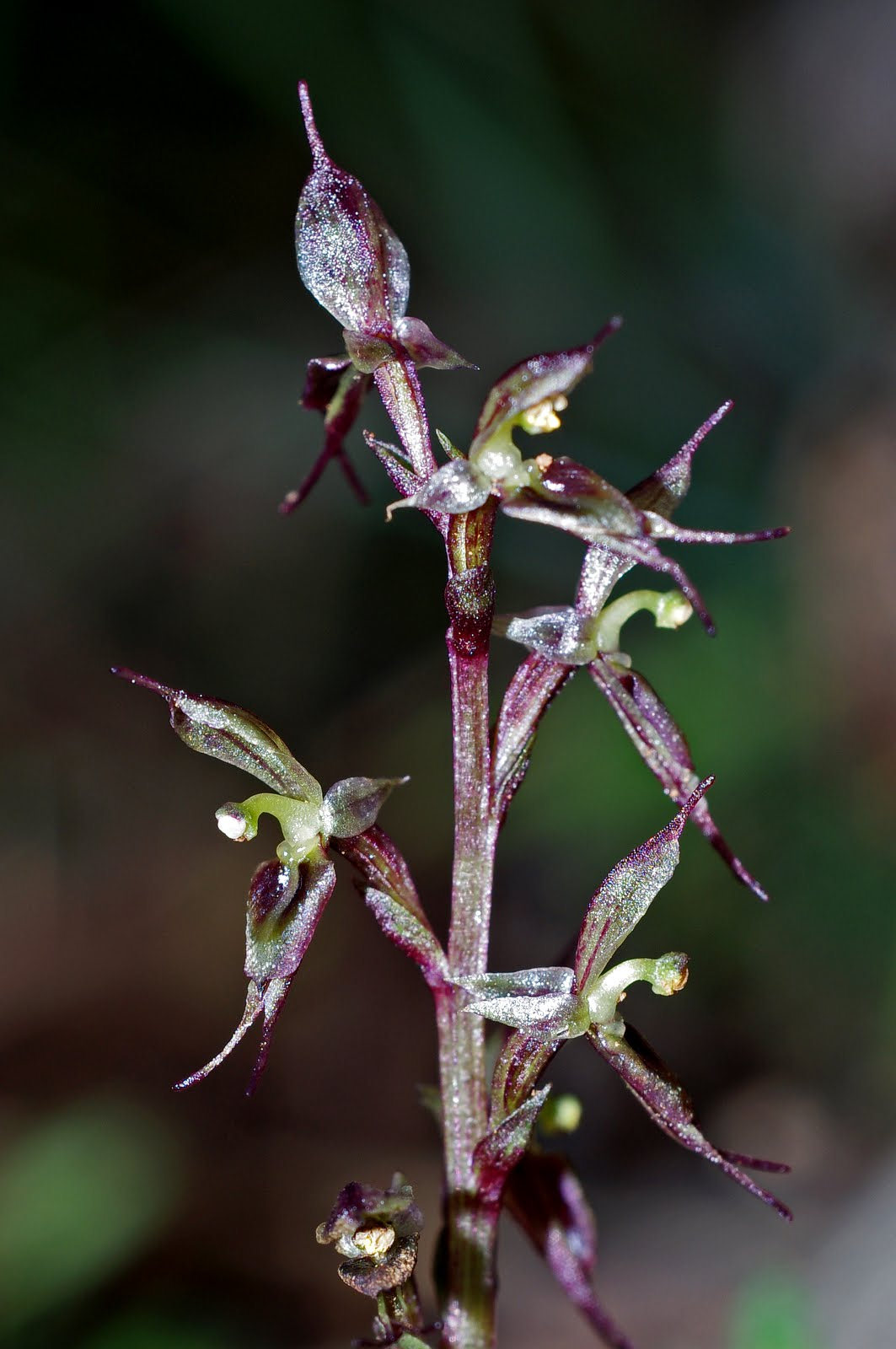

Scientific classification
- Kingdom: Plantae
- Clade: Tracheophytes
- Clade: Angiosperms
- Clade: Monocots
- Order: Asparagales
- Family: Orchidaceae
- Subfamily: Orchidoideae
- Tribe: Diurideae
- Genus: Acianthus
- Species: A. exsertus

Binomial name
- Acianthus exsertus D.L.Jones

Synonyms
- Acianthus brunonis F.Muell. nom. illeg., nom. superfl. p.p.; Epipactis exserta (R.Br.) Poir.

= Acianthus exsertus =

Large mosquito orchid

Species of flowering plant

Acianthus exsertus, commonly known as gnat orchid or large mosquito orchid, is a species of flowering plant in the orchid family Orchidaceae and is endemic to eastern Australia. It is a terrestrial herb with a single, heart-shaped leaf and up to 25 small, fine, dark brown flowers with pinkish and purplish markings and is found growing in sheltered places in forests in Queensland, New South Wales the ACT and Victoria.

== Description ==
Acianthus exsertus is a terrestrial, perennial, deciduous, sympodial herb with a single heart-shaped, glabrous, dark green leaf that is reddish-purple on its lower surface. The leaf is 15–40 mm (0.6–2 in) long, 10–30 mm (0.4–1 in) wide.

There are from 3 to 25 flowers, well-spaced on a thin raceme, 100–300 mm (4–10 in) tall, each flower 12–16 mm (0.5–0.6 in) long. The dorsal sepal is linear to egg-shaped, 7–9 mm (0.3–0.4 in) long, 3 mm (0.12 in) wide with a point 2–3 mm (0.08–0.1 in) long with a red central stripe and forms a hood only partly covering the column. The lateral sepals are 8–9 mm (0.3–0.4 in) long, 1 mm (0.04 in) wide, linear to narrow lance-shaped, with a tip 2–3 mm (0.08–0.1 in) long and project forwards parallel to each other or diverging. The petals are a similar colour and are 4–5 mm (0.16–0.20 in) long, about 1 mm (0.04 in) wide, linear to narrow egg-shaped and turn towards the ovary. The labellum is 5–6 mm (0.20–0.24 in) wide, 3.5–4 mm (0.1–0.2 in) wide, heart-shaped to elliptic, dished near the base with the edges rolled under but lacking teeth. The thick, fleshy callus has many small pimple-like papillae on the outer half. Flowering occurs from March to August.

This species is distinguished from other mosquito orchids by its relatively large, well-spaced, dark coloured flowers and by the dorsal sepal which does not cover the column.

== Taxonomy and naming ==
Acianthus exsertus was first formally described by Robert Brown in 1810 and the description was published in Prodromus Florae Novae Hollandiae. The specific epithet (exsertus) is a Latin word meaning to "stretch out" or "thrust out".

== Distribution and habitat ==
This orchid is widespread and locally common, sometimes in coastal areas but more usually on the ranges and tablelands in sheltered forest and woodland, growing in well-drained soil. In Queensland, it occurs as far north as Rockhampton, in New South Wales in most regions of the coast and tablelands and in eastern Victoria, from sea level to an altitude of 800 m (3,000 ft).

== Conservation ==
Acianthus exsertus is not threatened in New South Wales.
