= Mount Duval (New South Wales) =

Mountain in Australia

- Duval Mount
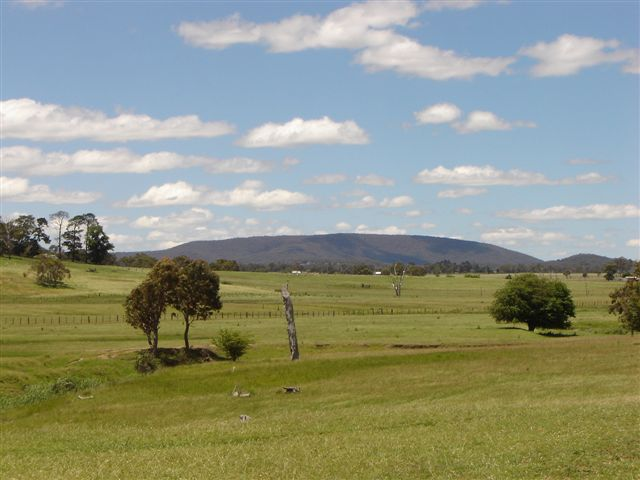
- Mount Duval from the southwest

Highest point
- Elevation: 1,393 m (4,570 ft)
- Coordinates: 30°24′S 151°38′E

Geography
- Location within New South Wales
- Location: Northern Tablelands, New South Wales, Australia
- Parent range: New England Range. Great Dividing Range
- Topo map: Dumaresq

Climbing
- Easiest route: Walk (hike)

Mount Duval, a large forested mountain of the New England Range, part of the Great Dividing Range, is located on the Northern Tablelands in the New England region of New South Wales, Australia.

With an elevation of 1,393 metres (4,570 ft) above sea level, Mount Duval is one of the largest peaks in the area, dominating the Armidale skyline located approximately 15 kilometres (9.3 mi) to the south of the summit. Mount Duval features on the logo of the Armidale Dumaresq Council.

The mountain was named after John Duval, a convict and servant of a local pastoralist who worked in the area around the mountain in the 1830s. Most of the mountain is contained within the Duval Nature Reserve. Duval College at the University of New England is also named after the mountain.

== Little Mount Duval ==
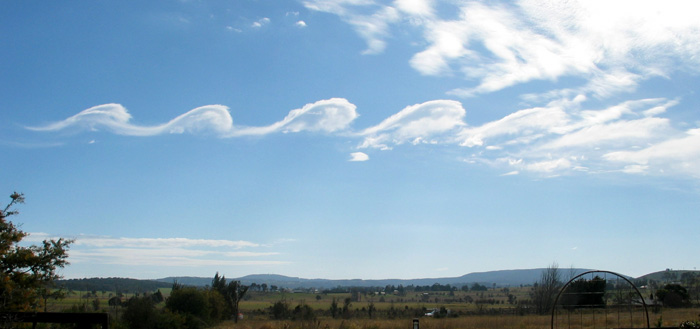
An unusual cloud formation over Mount Duval and Little Duval (on left), due to Kelvin-Helmholtz instability

To the north-west of Mount Duval sits Little Mount Duval, with an elevation of 1,404 metres (4,606 ft) above sea level, slightly higher than Mount Duval. When viewed from Armidale, Little Mount Duval appears much smaller and was so named accordingly. On the summit of Little Mount Duval sit the transmission relay towers for a number of radio and television stations that broadcast into Armidale.

== See also ==
- List of mountains in New South Wales
