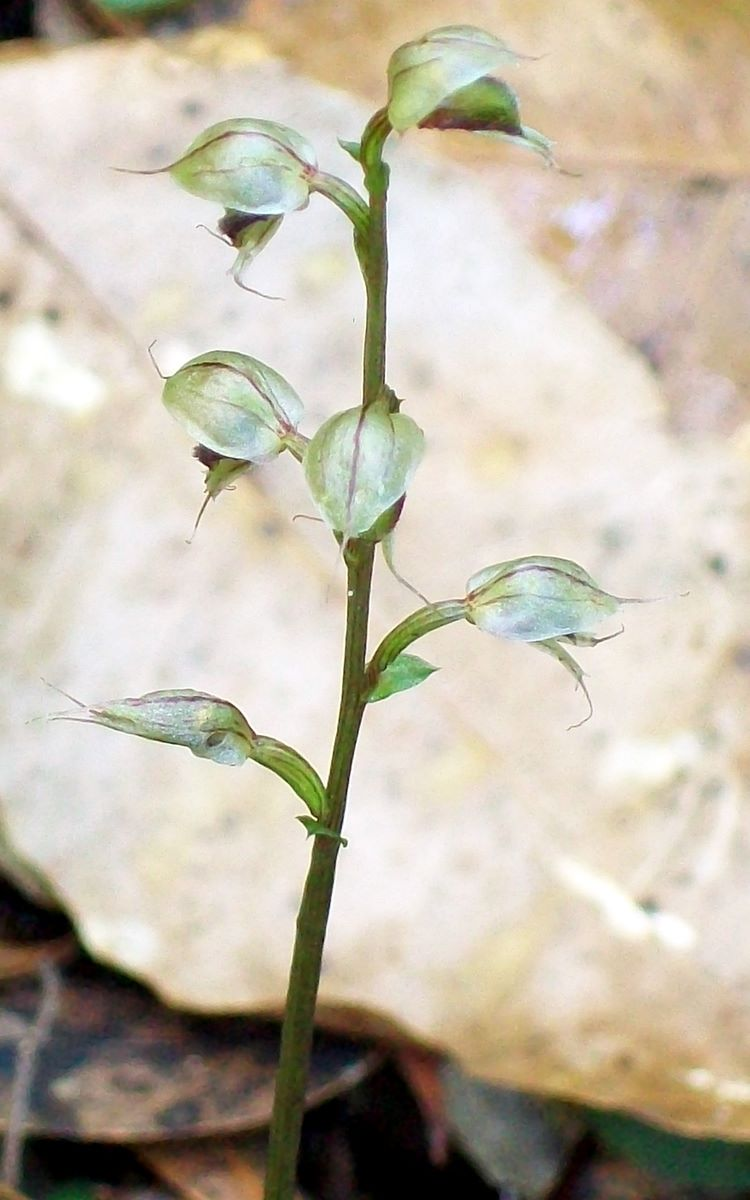
- A. fornicatus at Chatswood West, Australia

Scientific classification
- Kingdom: Plantae
- Clade: Tracheophytes
- Clade: Angiosperms
- Clade: Monocots
- Order: Asparagales
- Family: Orchidaceae
- Subfamily: Orchidoideae
- Tribe: Diurideae
- Genus: Acianthus
- Species: A. fornicatus

Binomial name
- Acianthus fornicatus R.Br.

Synonyms
- Acianthus brunonis F.Muell. nom. illeg., nom. superfl. p.p.; Acianthus fornicatus R.Br. var. fornicatus; Epipactis fornicata (R.Br.) Poir.

= Acianthus fornicatus =

Bristly mosquito orchid

Species of flowering plant

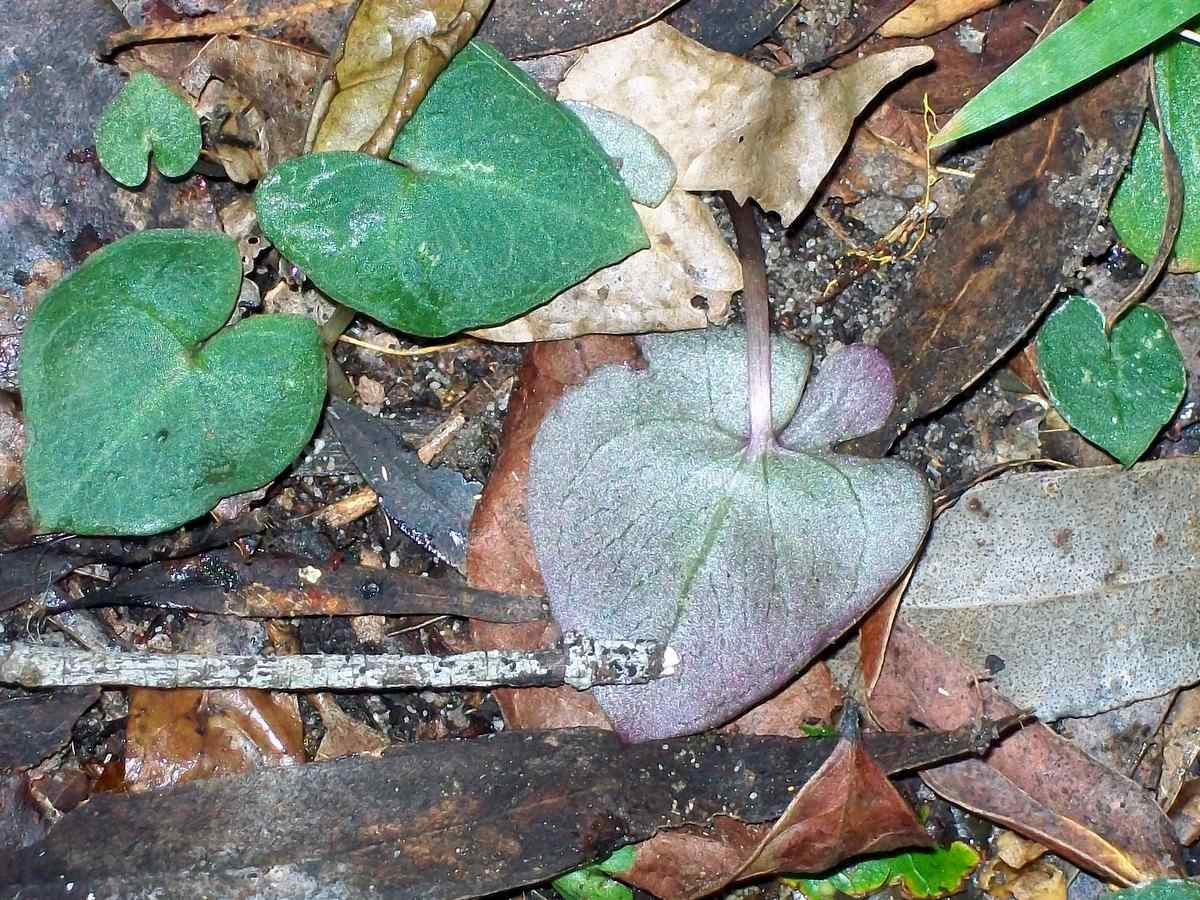
Upper and lower (purplish) leaf surfaces of A. fornicatus

Acianthus fornicatus, commonly known as bristly mosquito orchid or pixie caps, is a species of flowering plant in the orchid family Orchidaceae and is endemic to eastern Australia. It is a terrestrial herb with a single, heart-shaped leaf and up to ten translucent pinkish-red flowers, and is widespread and common in coastal and near-coastal areas.

== Description ==
Acianthus fornicatus is a terrestrial, perennial, deciduous, sympodial herb with a single heart-shaped, glabrous, dark green leaf which is reddish-purple on its lower surface. The leaf is 10–40 mm (0.4–2 in) long, 10–20 mm (0.4–0.8 in) wide on a stalk 4–9 cm (2–4 in) high.

There are up to ten flowers, well-spaced on a raceme 100–300 mm (4–10 in) tall, each flower 10–40 mm (0.4–2 in) long and translucent, pinkish-red with a green, sometimes blackish labellum. The dorsal sepal is broadly egg-shaped, 9–12 mm (0.4–0.5 in) long, 5–6 mm (0.20–0.24 in) wide and forms a hood over the column. The lateral sepals are 9–12 mm (0.4–0.5 in) long, 1.4 mm (0.06 in) long wide with tips 2–4 mm (0.08–0.2 in) long and may be crossed or parallel to each other. The petals are about 4 mm × 1 mm (0.2 in × 0.04 in) long and spread widely. The labellum is green, rarely blackish, egg-shaped to lance-shaped, with the outer edges turned under. When flattened, it is heart-shaped, 5–6 mm (0.20–0.24 in) long, 2.5–3 mm (0.098–0.12 in). There is a thick, fleshy callus covering most of the central area and many small pimple-like papillae on the outer half. Flowering occurs between May and August.

This species is distinguished from others in the genus by its largish, projecting flowers, usually pinkish colouring, and broad dorsal sepal and labellum.

== Taxonomy and naming ==
Acianthus fornicatus was first formally described by Robert Brown in 1810 and the description was published in Prodromus florae Novae Hollandiae. The specific epithet (fornicatus) is a Latin word meaning "vaulted" or "arched".

== Distribution and habitat ==
This mosquito orchid is widespread and common in coastal and near-coastal areas in heathy forest and coastal scrub, growing in well-drained sandy loam. It occurs in Queensland and in New South Wales as far south as Eden.

== Conservation ==
Acianthus fornicatus is not threatened in New South Wales, but is classified as threatened in Victoria, where it is found only on Gabo Island.
