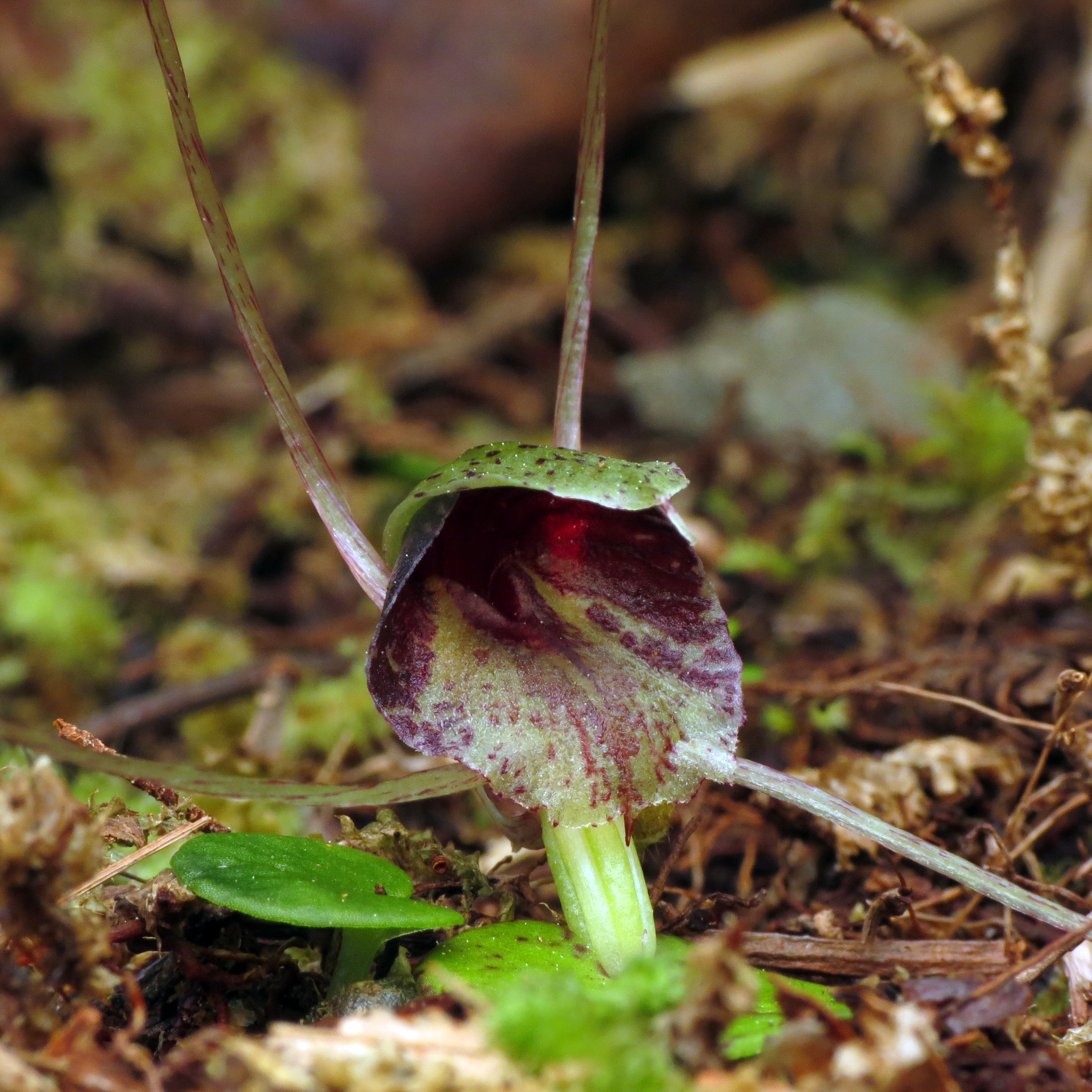
- Corybas hatchii near Point Elizabeth

Scientific classification
- Kingdom: Plantae
- Clade: Tracheophytes
- Clade: Angiosperms
- Clade: Monocots
- Order: Asparagales
- Family: Orchidaceae
- Subfamily: Orchidoideae
- Tribe: Diurideae
- Genus: Corybas
- Species: C. hatchii

Binomial name
- Corybas hatchii Lehnebach

Synonyms
- Corybas macranthus var. longipetalus Hatch; Corybas longipetalus (Hatch) Hatch; Corysanthes longipetala (Hatch) Szlach., nom. illeg.; Nematoceras longipetalum (Hatch) Molloy, D.L.Jones & M.A.Clem.

= Corybas hatchii =

Species of orchid

Corybas hatchii is a species of terrestrial orchid endemic to New Zealand. It has a solitary rounded leaf, often flecked with maroon, and a single pale green and maroon flower with long, threadlike lateral sepals and petals.

== Description ==
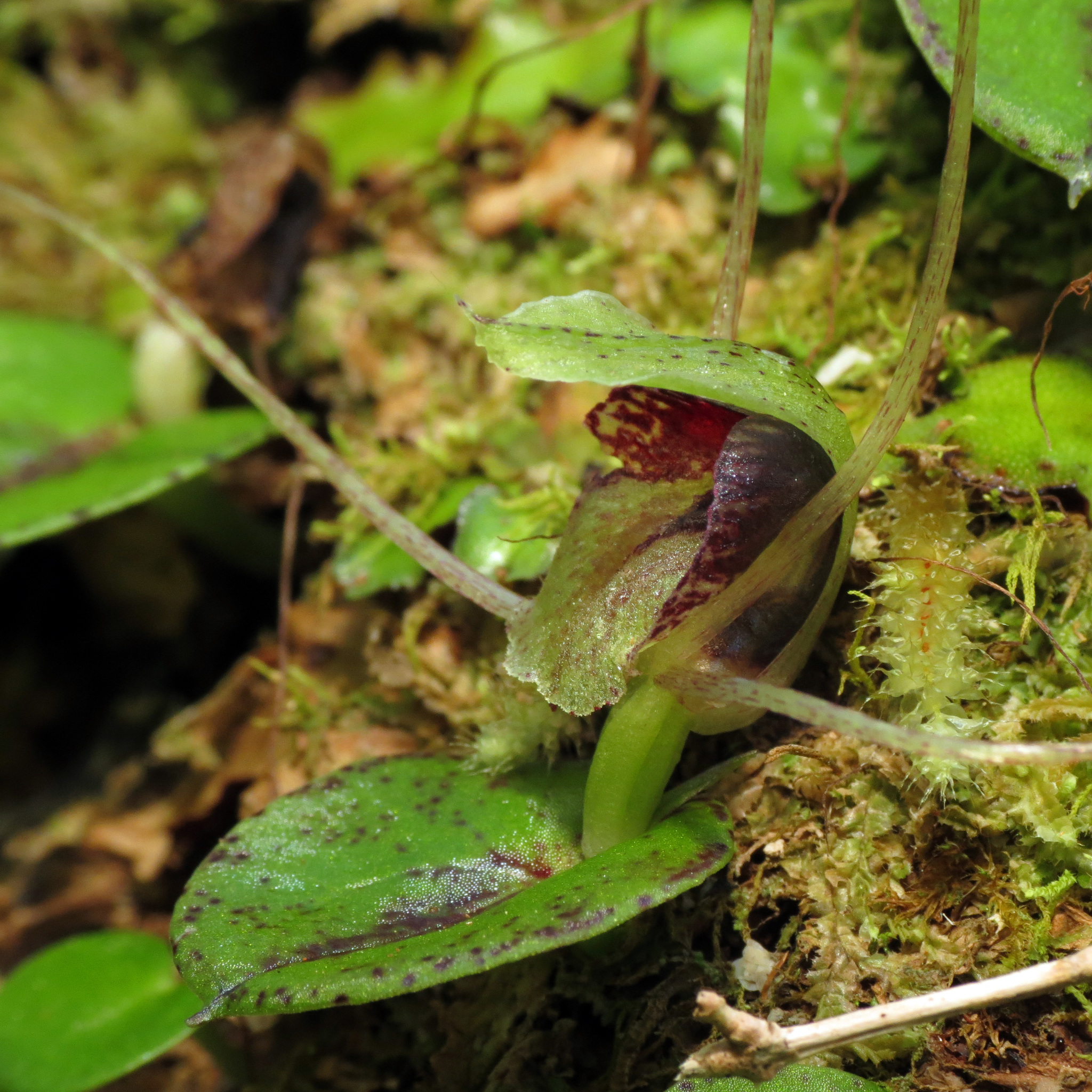
Side view of Corybas hatchii showing rounded leaf and relative lengths of dorsal sepal and labellum

Corybas hatchii is a terrestrial, perennial, tuberous herb with a solitary fleshy rounded leaf born on a short petiole. The leaf base is either rounded or slightly cordate. Its upper surface is green and often flecked with maroon, while the lower surface is silvery. The leaf itself is 15–28 × 11–20 mm.

C. hatchii bears a single flower that is held noticeably above the leaf. The peduncle is short, but the ovary is oblong and slightly ridged; it is held straight or slightly away from the leaf. The ovary is accompanied by two slender green floral bracts of unequal lengths; the smaller one points towards the leaf and is extremely small, while the larger one is around the length of the ovary and points away from the leaf.

The flower's dorsal sepal is approximately equal to the labellum in length and slender with a pointed tip, slightly arched downwards. It is translucent white to pale green and often flecked with deep crimson. The lateral sepals and petals are filiform (threadlike) and greatly exceed the labellum in length. They are pale cream and spotted with maroon. The labellum is auriculate (forming two lobes) at the base and strong downturned; its main portion, the lamina, is broad and rhomboidal with a sharp tip. Its upper margins are folded inwards, and its lower margins and flat and very finely toothed. The labellum is dark maroon at the base, while its lamina is translucent green or white, very often with crimson-maroon stripes that transition into flecks or spots near the borders. Flowering occurs from July to November. The peduncle elongates greatly as the capsule ripens.

Corybas hatchii resembles several closely related species, such as Corybas papa, but it may be distinguished its petiolate rather than sessile leaf; its usually translucent to red, rather than green, flowers (although they can rarely be more greenish); its forward-pointing and parallel, rather than widely spreading, lateral sepals and petals; and its higher-altitude habitats and later flowering period.

== Taxonomy ==
Corybas hatchii was first described in 1947 by Edwin Daniel Hatch as Corybas macranthus var. longipetalus. Subsequently, in 1993, Hatch unsuccessfully attempted to raise the taxon to species status as Corybas longipetalus; he was unaware that the name had already been used in 1923 for a New Guinea species, Corybas longipetalus (Ridl.) Schltr.

In 2002, Brian Molloy, David Jones, and Mark Clements transferred this taxon into the genus Nematoceras under the name Nematoceras longipetalum. However, in 2014, a dissertation by Stephanie Lyon that analyzed DNA markers from Corybas species occurring from the Himalayas to New Zealand indicated that Nematoceras and other genera that Molloy, Jones, and Clements had split ought to be returned to Corybas. Although the World Checklist of Selected Plant Families and the New Zealand Department of Conservation recognized these merges, Nematoceras longipetalum and two other Nematoceras species remained unplaced because they had no combination under Corybas and thus could not be automatically transferred. Finally, in 2016, Carlos Lehnebach transferred the species to Corybas under its current name, Corybas hatchii, which was a novel binomial combination (nomen novum).

As of 2016, molecular analysis of the ITS region, a sequence of DNA widely used in molecular phylogeny to reconstruct evolutionary relationships between taxa, suggests that C. hatchii belongs to a clade of closely related species known as the C. rivularis complex. Members of this complex share a tapering dorsal sepal, filiform lateral sepals and petals, a prominent notch at the throat of the labellum tube, and fleshy leaves, as well as a preference for perennially wet habitats. Molecular evidence suggests that the C. rivularis complex consists of two sister clades, with C. hatchii most closely allied to C. iridescens, C. dienemus, and C. orbiculatus. Morphological evidence supports this conclusion; compared to the other clade comprising C. rivularis s.s. and C. papa, the former species tend to have a larger labellum with a less pronounced notch, as well as a petiolate rather than sessile leaf.

== Distribution and habitat ==
Corybas hatchii is endemic to New Zealand's North Island and South Island, primarily towards the west. It grows in lowland to subalpine habitats in damp seepages in base-rich substrates, such as calcareous mudstones, siltstones, limestones, basalt, basaltic andesites, and andesitic tephra.
