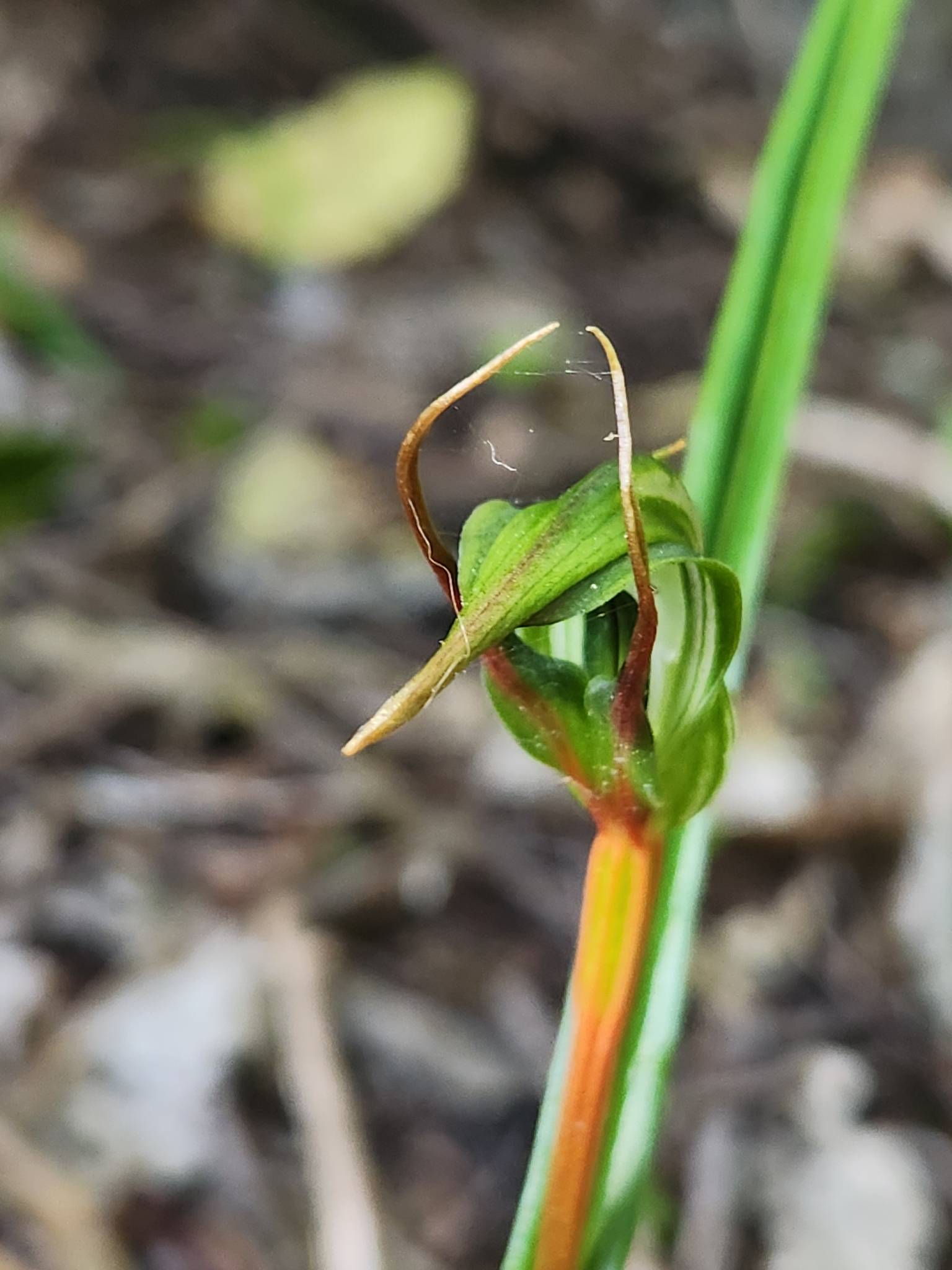

Conservation status
- Nationally Vulnerable (NZ TCS)

Scientific classification
- Kingdom: Plantae
- Clade: Tracheophytes
- Clade: Angiosperms
- Clade: Monocots
- Order: Asparagales
- Family: Orchidaceae
- Subfamily: Orchidoideae
- Tribe: Cranichideae
- Genus: Pterostylis
- Species: P. irwinii

Binomial name
- Pterostylis irwinii D.L.Jones, Molloy & M.A.Clem.

= Pterostylis irwinii =

Irwin's greenhood

Species of plant

Pterostylis irwinii is a species of greenhood orchid endemic to New Zealand. Flowering plants have erect, linear leaves on the flowering stem while non-flowering plants have a rosette of egg-shaped leaves. There is a single green flower with translucent white stripes and reddish-brown tips.

== Description ==
Pterostylis irwinii is a terrestrial, perennial, deciduous, herb with an underground tuber and which often grows in loose colonies. Non-flowering plants have a rosette of two or three, more or less egg-shaped leaves which are 40–150 mm (2–6 in) long and 30–50 mm (1–2 in) wide. Flowering plants have a single flower 35–45 mm (1–2 in) long and 10–12 mm (0.4–0.5 in) wide on a reddish flowering stem 150–200 mm (6–8 in) tall with three to five stem leaves with their bases wrapped around the stem. The stem leaves are linear to lance-shaped, 60–170 mm (2–7 in) long and 4–5 mm (0.16–0.20 in) wide. The dorsal sepal and petals are fused, forming a hood or "galea" over the column. The dorsal sepal is 43–48 mm (1.7–1.9 in) long, 14–16 mm (0.55–0.63 in) wide and has a rough surface. It is erect near its base, then curves forward with the dorsal sepal longer than the petals. The lateral sepals are more or less erect with narrow tips 24–27 mm (0.9–1 in) long with a deep notch in the sinus between them and a wide gap between them and the galea. The labellum is 15–18 mm (0.6–0.7 in) long and about 3 mm (0.1 in) wide, curved, reddish-brown and protrudes above the sinus. Flowering occurs between October and January.

== Taxonomy and naming ==
Pterostylis irwinii was first formally described in 1997 by David Jones, Brian Molloy and Mark Clements and the description was published in The Orchadian. The specific epithet (irwinii) honours J. Bruce Irwin who collected the type specimen at Erua near the Tongariro National Park in 1991.

== Distribution and habitat ==
Irwin's greenhood seems to prefer damp positions in tall forest or steep hilly places with basic rocks such as limestone. On the North Island it occurs on the Waimarino River floodplain and near Cape Palliser. On the South Island it grows in the north west as far south as the Buller River with a few observations further south.

== Conservation ==
Under the New Zealand Threat Classification System, this species is listed as "Nationally Vulnerable" with the qualifiers of "Biologically Sparse", "Data Poor: Recognition", "Data Poor: Size", "Data Poor: Trend" and "Extreme Fluctuations".
