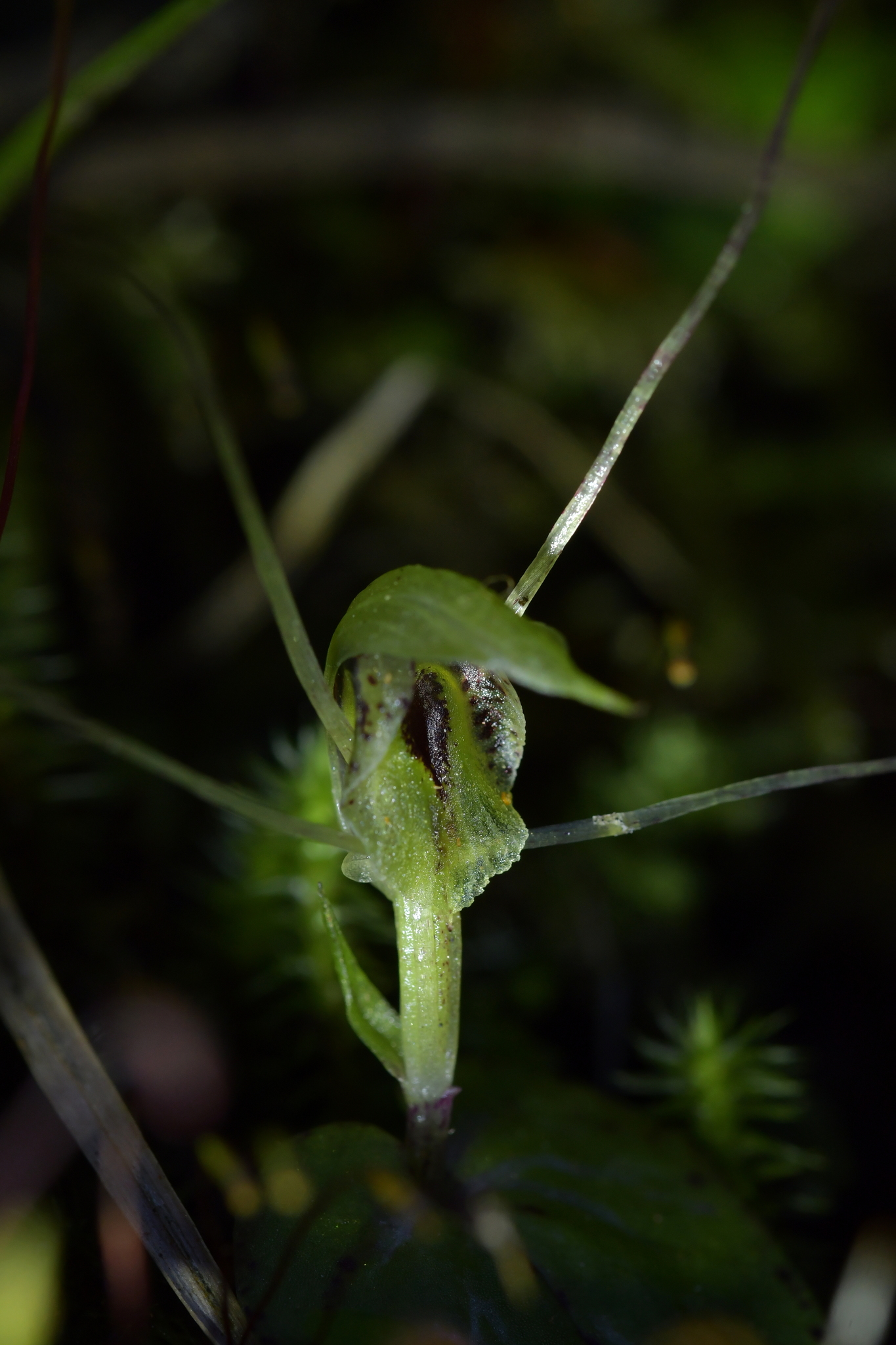
- Corybas papa in Tongariro National Park

Scientific classification
- Kingdom: Plantae
- Clade: Embryophytes
- Clade: Tracheophytes
- Clade: Angiosperms
- Clade: Monocots
- Order: Asparagales
- Family: Orchidaceae
- Subfamily: Orchidoideae
- Tribe: Diurideae
- Genus: Corybas
- Species: C. papa

Binomial name
- Corybas papa Irwin & Molloy

Synonyms
- Corysanthes papa (Irwin & Molloy) Szlach.; Nematoceras papa (Irwin & Molloy) Molloy, D.L.Jones & M.A.Clem.

= Corybas papa =

Species of orchid

Corybas papa is a species of terrestrial orchid endemic to the North Island of New Zealand. It has a solitary wedge-shaped leaf and single translucent green flower with a strongly deflexed labellum and slender, threadlike lateral sepals and petals.

== Description ==
Corybas papa is a terrestrial, perennial herb with a solitary fleshy wedge-shaped leaf that is sessile (lacking a noticeable petiole). The tip of the leaf is apiculate, with the minute apex curved downward, and the base is heart-shaped. The leaf is dull green and slightly grooved on the upper surface, with occasionally maroon spotting primarily distributed around the margins, and the undersides are silvery. The tuberoids are roughly spherical.

C. papa bears minute solitary green flowers around 10–15 mm long. These flowers are connected to a very short purple-streaked peduncle that greatly elongates as the elliptical capsule (10–16 mm long) ripens. The ovary is curved and is accompanied by two slender floral bracts of unequal length; the shorter one is reduced and points towards the leaf, while the longer, at least double the length of the other bract and around the length of the ovary, points away from the leaf.

The flower's dorsal sepal is 15–20 mm in length and forms a slender arching hood over the labellum. It is green and faintly veined with purple. The apex is tapered and extends noticeably beyond the labellum. The lateral sepals and petals are long and filiform (thread-like, only 0.5–mm wide), far exceeding the labellum in length. They are green, sometimes speckled with maroon, and spread radially outward from the flower. The sepals (50–70 mm long) are slightly longer than the petals (40–60 mm) and point upwards, whereas the petals spread horizontally outward and are minutely lobed at the base. The labellum forms a tubelike structure near its base that abruptly curves up to 180° downwards, flattens out, and expands to form a broad oval-shaped surface visible from the front of the flower, which is called the lamina (around 6–8 mm across). The throat of the labellum tube is notched, with its upper margins folded inward. The lower portion of the lamina has a slightly jagged border and a slightly bumpy surface. The labellum is pale green, although the tube and upper margins of the lamina are often maroon. Flowering occurs from September to October.

The column, 2.5–3 mm long, is broadest at the base and tilted backwards. The stigma, 0.7 mm across, is shield shaped and concave, with its borders minutely fringed. The anther is crested and carries 4 pollinia in 2 pairs. The pollinia are oblong and yellow. Like other members of the Orchidoideae, the pollinia are sectile, meaning they are mealy or granular, composed of aggregated clumps of pollen that may be more easily broken apart. The rounded viscidium, which is a sticky pad connected to the pollinia, is 0.5 mm across. It is concave and white, though it matures to a green-brown.

C. papa closely resembles C. rivularis but can be distinguished by its predominantly green flowers, as well as its slender, more dramatically deflexed labellum. Its leaves are also sessile and more wedge-shaped.

== Taxonomy ==
The type specimen of Corybas papa was collected at the Whangamomona Saddle in Taranaki near a roadside bank at 260 m in 1992 by James Bruce Irwin and Brian Molloy. It was illustrated under the name Corybas rivularis. Later, in 1994, C. rivularis-like populations on Mt. Taranaki were recognized as a separate entity and were given the informal name Corybas "Mt Messenger". In 1996, Molloy and Irwin formally described the species, thereby separating it from a group of highly similar species, then known as the C. rivularis complex. The specific epithet (papa), a Maori term for the earth, refers to a popular name for the Tertiary marine mudstones and siltstones in the type locality. The chromosome count for this species is 2n = 36.

In 2002, Brian Molloy, David Jones, and Mark Clements transferred the species into the genus Nematoceras under the name Nematoceras papa. In 2003, Dariusz Szlachetko attempted to transfer the species to the genus Corysanthes, but the change was not widely recognized and the species remained within Nematoceras. However, in a 2014 dissertation that analyzed DNA markers from Corybas species occurring from the Himalayas to New Zealand, Stephanie Lyon indicated that Nematoceras and other genera that Molloy, Jones, and Clements had segregated ought to be returned to Corybas. Since then, the World Checklist of Selected Plant Families and the New Zealand Department of Conservation has recognized these changes, and N. papa returned to its original name, Corybas papa.

== Ecology ==
C. papa is presumed to be pollinated by fungus gnats. It was observed in lab cultivation that Mycetophila gnats visiting flowers of C. iridescens, a related species in the C. rivularis complex, avoided C. papa, suggesting a reproductive barrier that may have contributed to speciation.

== Distribution and habitat ==
Corybas papa is endemic to the Taranaki region of New Zealand's North Island. It is known to occur from Port Waikato to the western Ruahine Range. It grows in coastal to montane habitats in calcium-rich papa substrates such as those consisting of mudstone and siltstone (for which it is named). It also grows in basaltic substrates. It usually grows near seepages or on the mossy banks of slow-flowing streams.

== Gallery ==
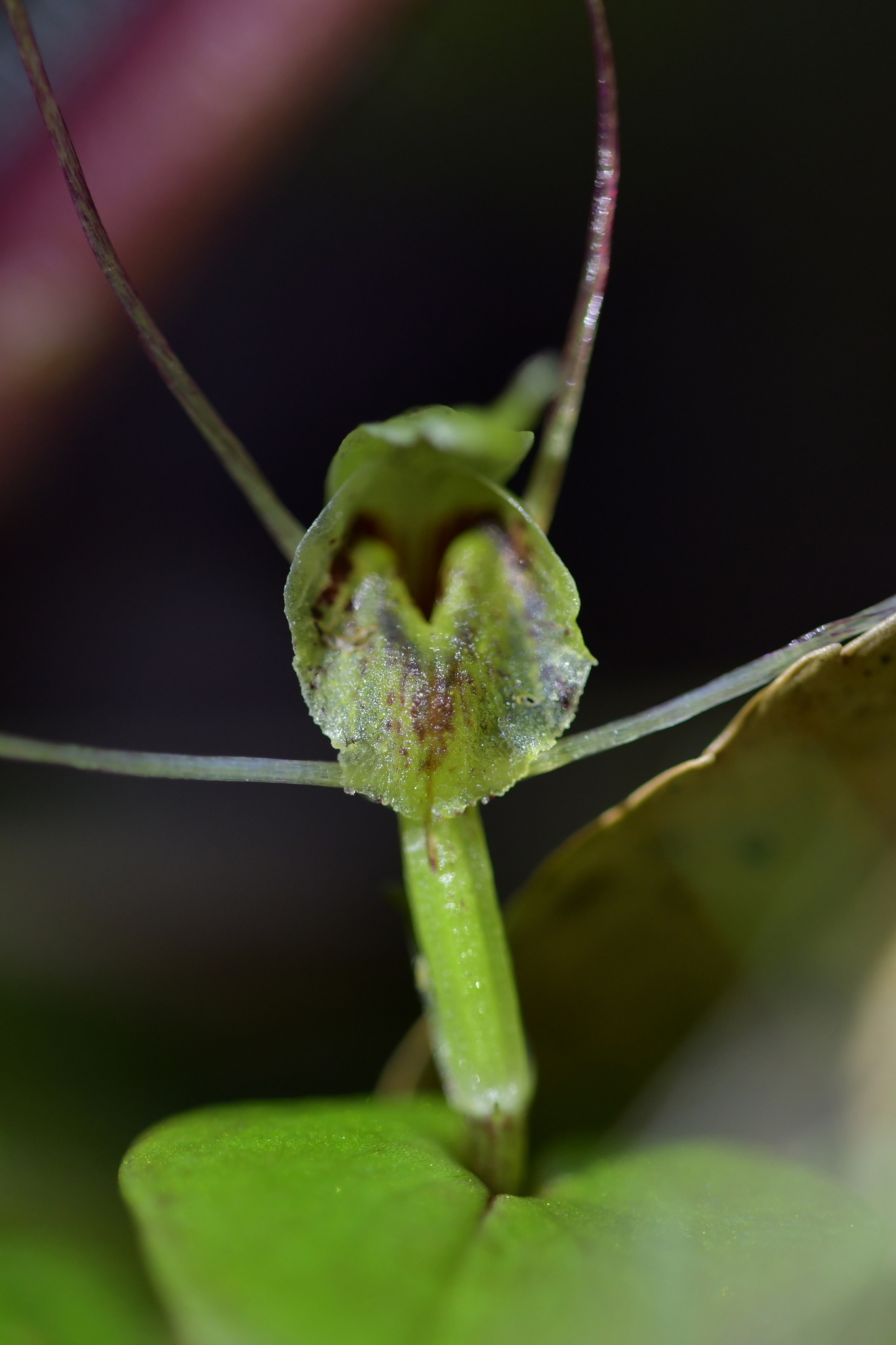
Close up of labellum detail showing notched labellum and infolded margins

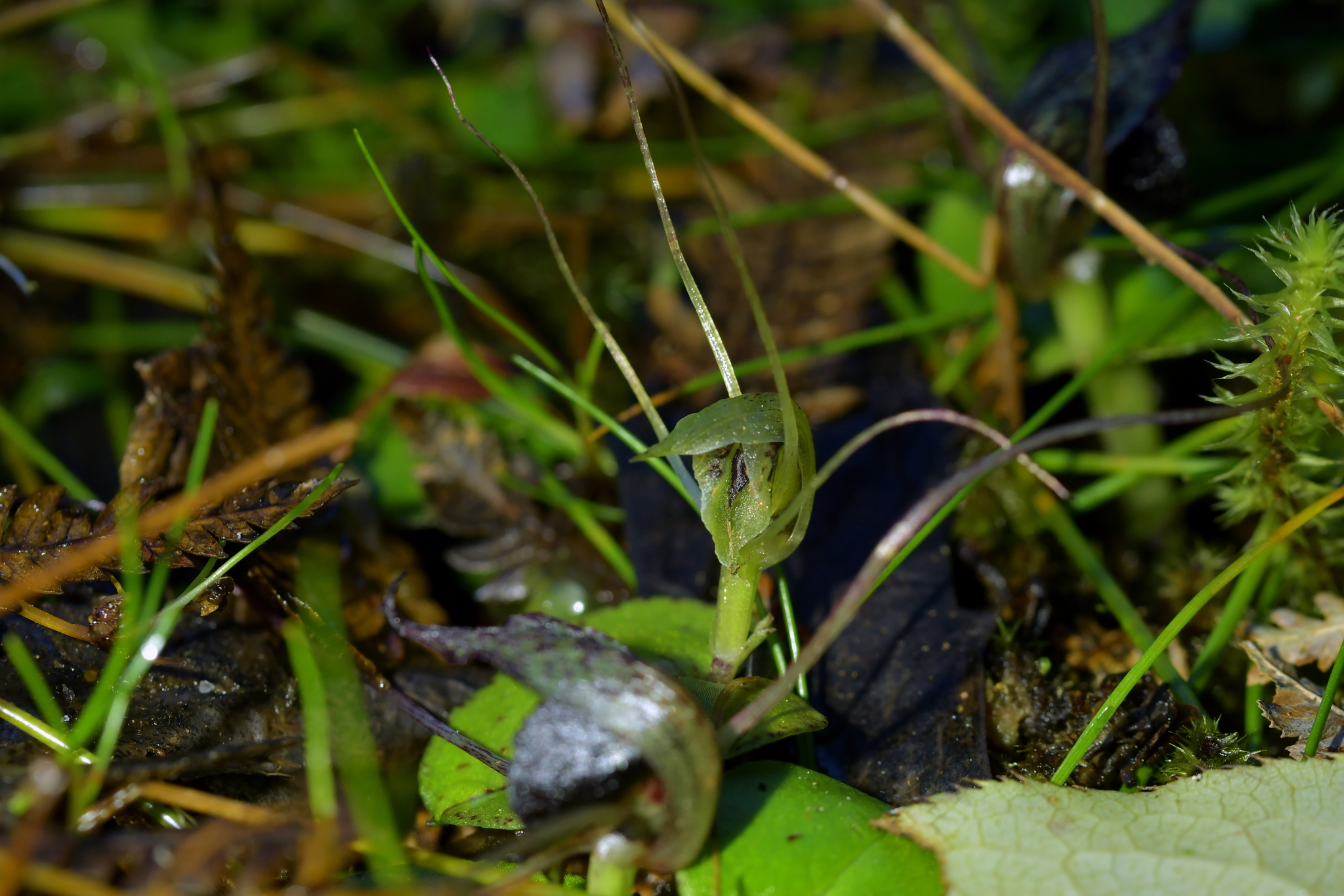
Side profile displaying the filiform sepals and petals, significantly deflexed labellum and sessile leaf.
