= Drymoanthus flavus =

Conservation status
- Declining (NZ TCS)

Scientific classification
- Kingdom: Plantae
- Clade: Tracheophytes
- Clade: Angiosperms
- Clade: Monocots
- Order: Asparagales
- Family: Orchidaceae
- Subfamily: Epidendroideae
- Genus: Drymoanthus
- Species: D. flavus

Binomial name
- Drymoanthus flavus St George & Molloy

Species of plant

Drymoanthus flavus is an orchid species endemic to New Zealand. It is found on the North Island, South Island, and Stewart Island. It is closely related to another New Zealand endemic, D. adversus. Its conservation status according to the New Zealand Threatened Classification is At Risk - Declining.

== Description ==
A small, perching orchid with cord-like roots and purple-spotted, leathery leaves. Flowers are yellow and grouped into racemose inflorescences up to 5 cm long. Fruits are capsules 1.5 cm long.

== Taxonomy ==
Drymoanthus flavus is in the family Orchidaceae. The species was first described in 1994 by New Zealand physician and orchidologist Ian St George and New Zealand botanist Brian Molloy.

Drymoanthus flavus is closely related to the other New Zealand endemic species in this genus, D. adversus. D. adversus is a tetraploid with a doubled genome compared to the diploid D. flavus. It has been hypothesised that D. adversus may be an autoploid derivative of D. flavus. The two species are morphologically similar but D. flavus is distinct in its yellow flowers and purple spotting on the leaves and capsules, compared to the greenish flowers with purple flecking and leaves without spots. Indeed the species name flavus refers to the yellow colour of the flowers.

== Distribution and habitat ==
Drymoanthus flavus is endemic to New Zealand and is found on the North Island, South Island, and Stewart Island, but is most common in southern Otago and Southland. It is an epiphytic, perching orchid that grows on branches and trunks of trees or shrubs in forests. It can grown over 20 different host tree species, all of which are native New Zealand species, including both flowering plants and podocarps.

== Conservation status ==
According to the most recent New Zealand Threat Classification (2023), the conservation status of Drymoanthus flavus is At Risk - Declining, which was the same as the previous assessment in 2017. This species also has the qualifiers "Sp" (Biologically Sparse), "DPS" (Data Poor: Size) and "DPT" (Data Poor: Trend).

== Gallery ==
Habit

Close up of flowers

Fruits

Perching habit and habitat
