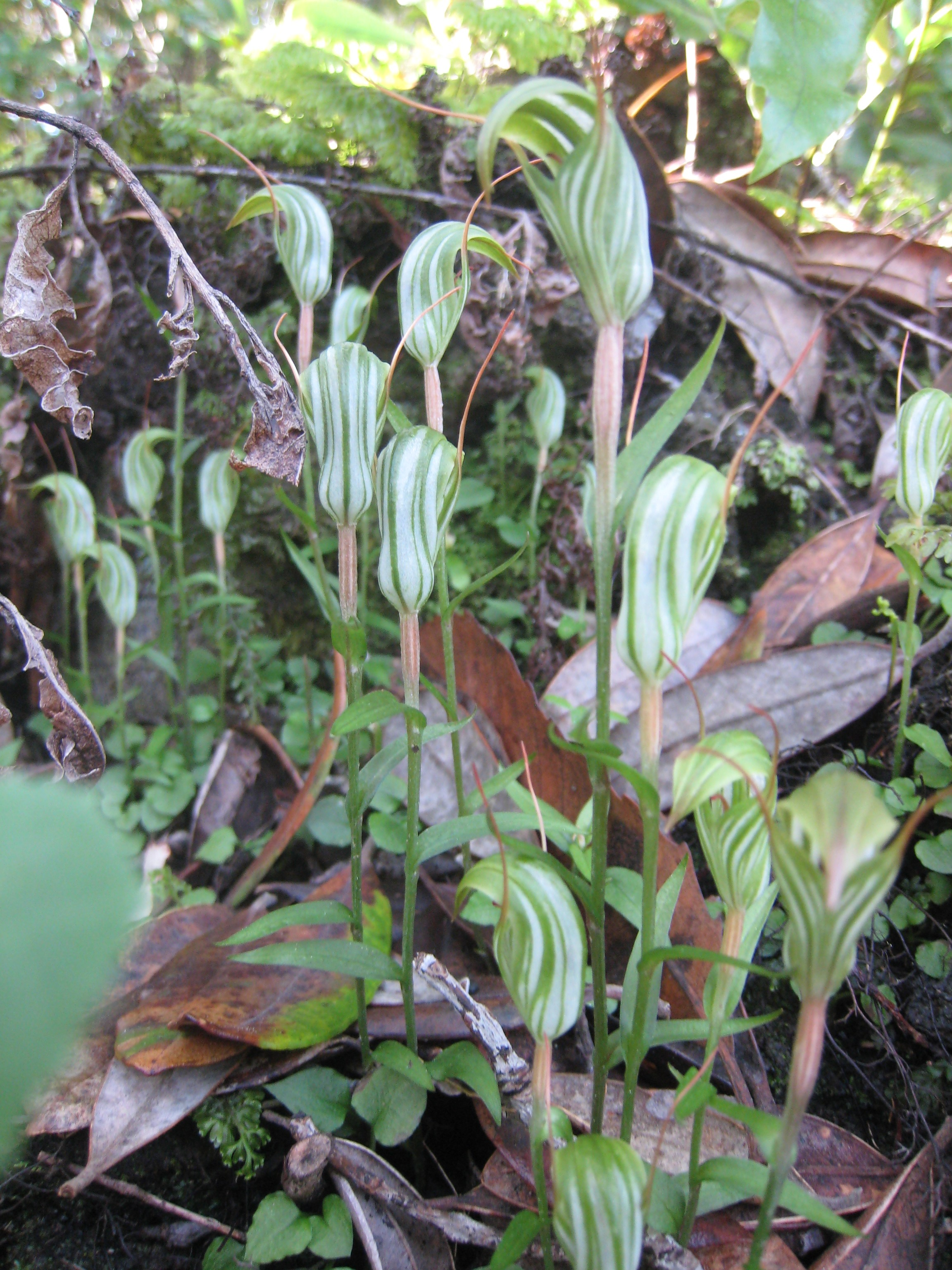
- Pterostylis alobula on Rangitoto Island

Scientific classification
- Kingdom: Plantae
- Clade: Tracheophytes
- Clade: Angiosperms
- Clade: Monocots
- Order: Asparagales
- Family: Orchidaceae
- Subfamily: Orchidoideae
- Tribe: Cranichideae
- Genus: Pterostylis
- Species: P. alobula

Binomial name
- Pterostylis alobula (Hatch) L.B.Moore

Synonyms
- Pterostylis trullifolia var. alobula Hatch; Diplodium alobulum (Hatch) D.L.Jones, Molloy & M.A.Clem.

= Pterostylis alobula =

Winter greenhood

Species of orchid

Pterostylis alobula, commonly known as winter greenhood, is a species of orchid endemic to New Zealand. As with similar greenhoods, the flowering plants differ from those which are not flowering. The non-flowering plants have a rosette of leaves flat on the ground but the flowering plants have a single flower with leaves on the flowering spike. This greenhood has pale green and white-striped flowers, similar to those of another New Zealand greenhood, P. trullifolia but are larger and paler in colour.

== Description ==
Pterostylis alobula is a terrestrial, perennial, deciduous, herb with an underground tuber and when not flowering, a rosette of mostly egg-shaped leaves, 5–15 millimetres (0.2–0.6 in) long and 4–15 millimetres (0.2–0.6 in) long with a stalk up to 10 millimetres (0.4 in) long. Flowering plants usually have a single pale green flower with white stripes 10–20 millimetres (0.4–0.8 in) high borne on a flowering stem up to 150 millimetres (6 in) high with between two and six linear to lance-shaped stem leaves 5–25 millimetres (0.2–1 in) long and 3–6 millimetres (0.1–0.2 in) wide. The dorsal sepal and petals are fused, forming a hood or "galea" over the column with its tip usually horizontal. The lateral sepals are erect, held closely against the galea and have a broad V-shaped sinus between their bases. The labellum is red, curved and projects above the sinus. Flowering occurs from March to October.

== Taxonomy and naming ==
The winter greenhood was first formally described in 1968 by Edwin Hatch and given the name Pterostylis trullifolia var. alobula. The description was published in Transactions and Proceedings of the Royal Society of New Zealand. In 1968 it was raised to species status by Lucy Moore. The specific epithet (alobula) is derived from the Latin word lobus meaning "an elongated projection or protuberance", "capsule" or "pod" with the prefix a- meaning "without".

== Distribution and habitat ==
The winter greenhood usually grows in sparse leaf litter under shrubs in forest but sometimes also in scrub or pasture. It occurs on both main islands of New Zealand and on some of the offshore islands.
