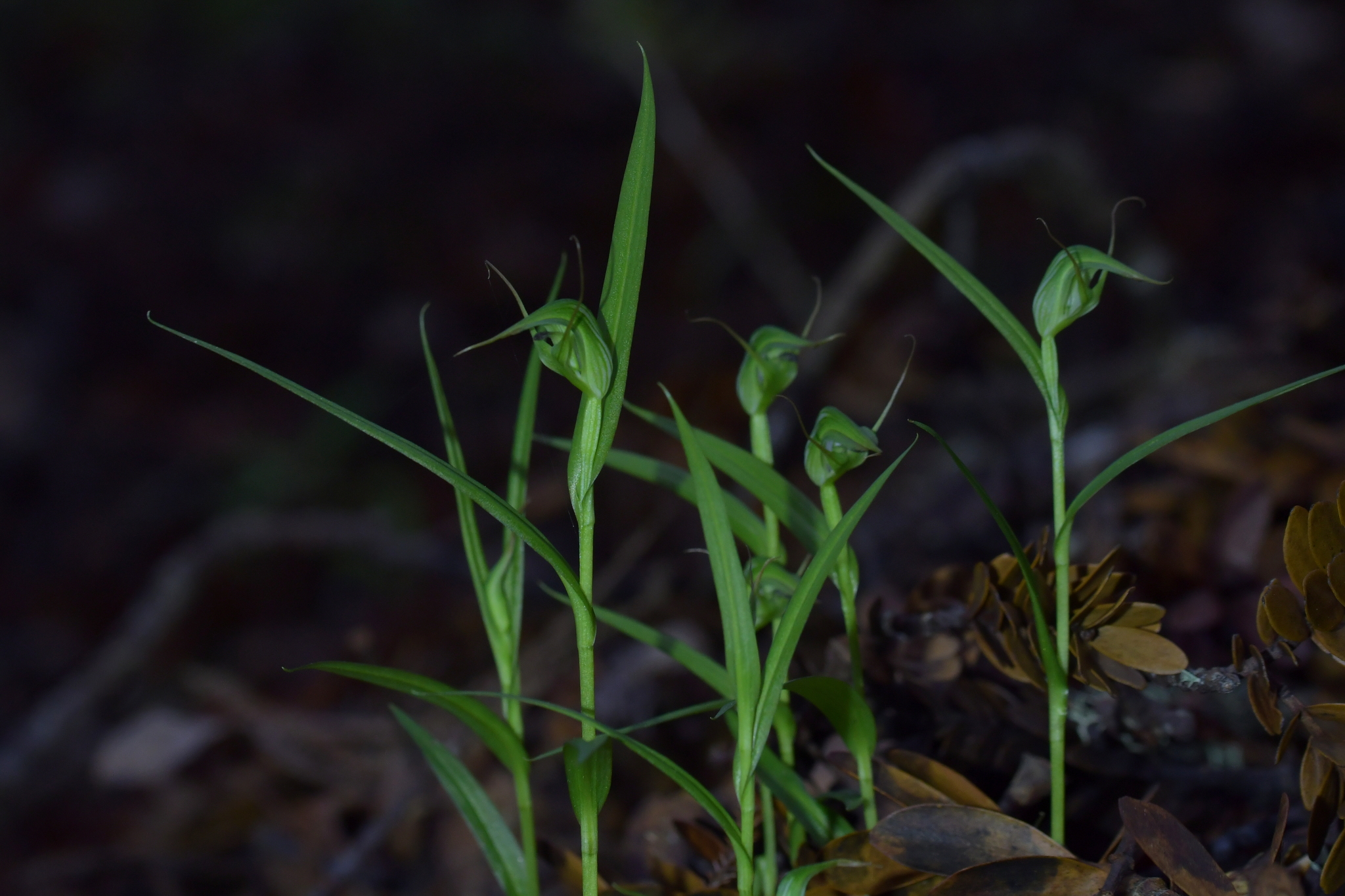

Scientific classification
- Kingdom: Plantae
- Clade: Tracheophytes
- Clade: Angiosperms
- Clade: Monocots
- Order: Asparagales
- Family: Orchidaceae
- Subfamily: Orchidoideae
- Tribe: Cranichideae
- Genus: Pterostylis
- Species: P. agathicola

Binomial name
- Pterostylis agathicola D.L.Jones, Molloy & M.A.Clem.

Synonyms
- Pterostylis graminea var. rubricaulis (H.B.Matthews) ex Cheeseman; Pterostylis montana var. rubricaulis (H.B.Matthews) ex Cheeseman) Hatch

= Pterostylis agathicola =

Kauri greenhood

Species of orchid

Pterostylis agathicola, commonly known as kauri greenhood, is a species of orchid endemic to the North Island of New Zealand. As with similar greenhoods, the flowering plants differ from those which are not flowering. The non-flowering plants have a rosette of leaves flat on the ground but the flowering plants have a single flower with leaves on the flowering spike. It grows almost exclusively in kauri (Agathis australis) forest and has a relatively large green and transparent white flower.

== Description ==
Pterostylis agathicola is a terrestrial, perennial, deciduous, herb with an underground tuber and when not flowering, a rosette of two or three dark green, linear to lance-shaped leaves. Each leaf is 30–60 mm (1–2 in) long and 3–6 mm (0.1–0.2 in) wide. Flowering plants have a single flower 24–28 mm (0.9–1 in) long borne on a spike 100–350 mm (4–10 in) high with three or four spreading stem leaves. The flowers are translucent white with green stripes and brownish tips. The dorsal sepal and petals are fused, forming a hood or "galea" over the column. The dorsal sepal is much longer than the petals and curves forward with a long, tapering tip. The lateral sepals are erect leaving a wide gap between them and the galea, and there is a deep narrow notch in the centre of the sinus between their bases. The labellum is 9–11 mm (0.35–0.43 in) long, about 3 mm (0.1 in) wide, curved, dark green to brownish, twist prominently to the right and protrudes above the sinus. Flowering occurs between July and October.

== Taxonomy and naming ==
Pterostylis agathicola was first formally described in 1997 by David Jones, Brian Molloy and Mark Clements from a specimen collected in the Waitākere Ranges. The description was published in The Orchadian.

== Distribution and habitat ==
Kauri greenhood only grows in kauri forest, often in leaf litter close to large trees. It is found on the North Island between Te Paki Recreation Reserve, the Te Kauri Scenic Reserve and the Kaimai Range.
