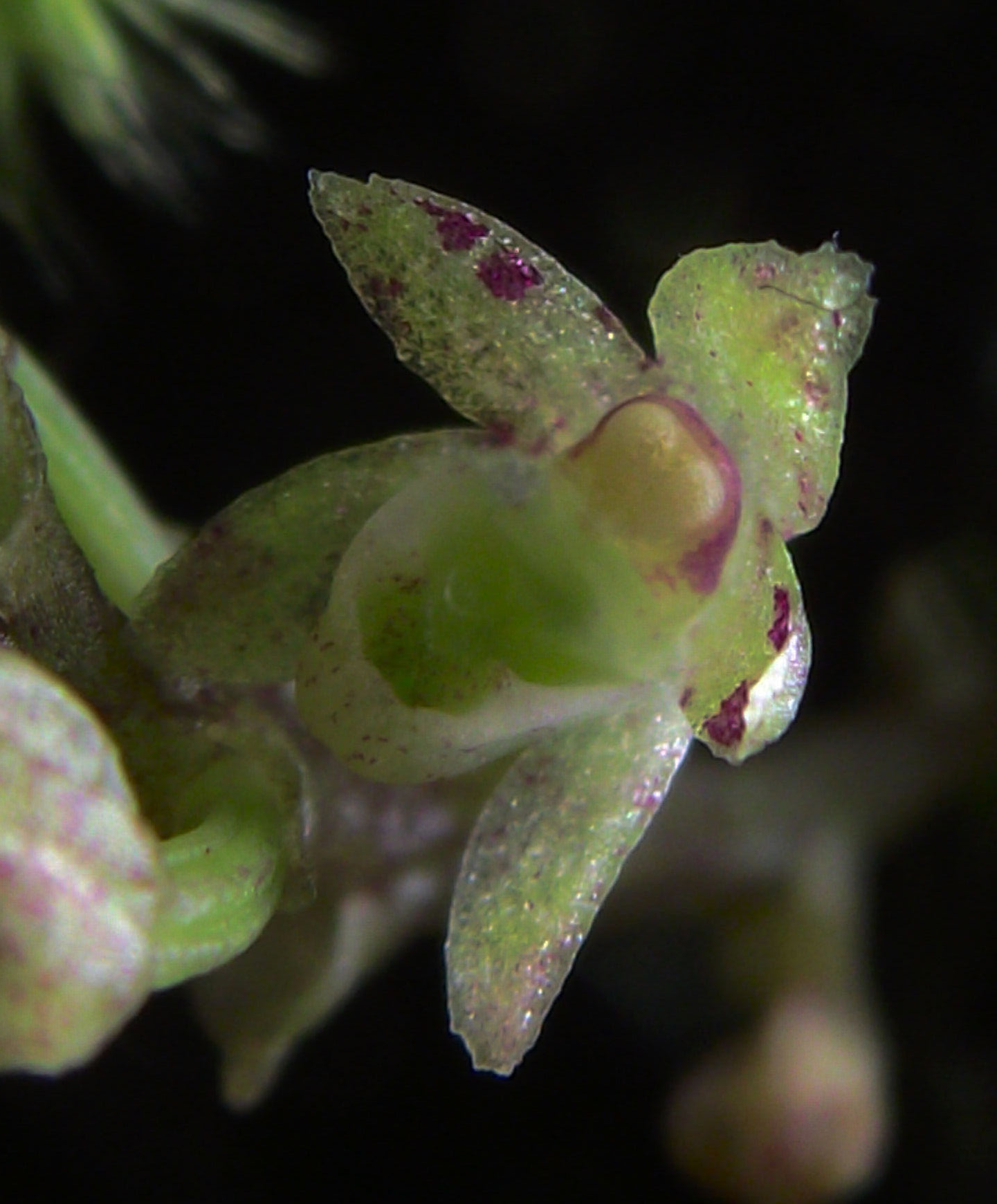
- Close up of Drymoanthus adversus flower

Scientific classification
- Kingdom: Plantae
- Clade: Tracheophytes
- Clade: Angiosperms
- Clade: Monocots
- Order: Asparagales
- Family: Orchidaceae
- Subfamily: Epidendroideae
- Tribe: Vandeae
- Subtribe: Aeridinae
- Genus: Drymoanthus; Nicholls

= Drymoanthus =

Genus of orchids

Drymoanthus, commonly known as midget orchids is a genus of epiphytic orchids in the family Orchidaceae. Plants in this genus are relatively small and unbranched with thick roots, narrow crowded leaves and small scented green flowers with a white labellum. There are four species, found in Australia, New Zealand and New Caledonia.

== Description ==
Orchids in the genus Drymoanthus are small, unbranched, epiphytic herbs with thick roots, a thin stem, narrow, crowded, thin, leathery leaves and small, short-lived green flowers with a white labellum. The sepals and petals are similar to each other although the petals are slightly shorter. The labellum is white, boat-shaped, unlobed and stiffly attached to the column.

== Taxonomy and naming ==
The genus Drymoanthus was first formally described in 1943 by William Henry Nicholls and the description was published in The Victorian Naturalist.

Seven species are accepted by Plants of the World Online:

- Drymoanthus adversus (Hook.f.) Dockrill - New Zealand including Chatham Island
- Drymoanthus brigittae (N.Hallé) M.A.Clem., D.L.Jones & D.P.Banks New Caledonia
- Drymoanthus flavus St.George & Molloy - New Zealand
- Drymoanthus florenciae (N.Hallé) M.A.Clem., D.L.Jones & D.P.Banks - New Caledonia
- Drymoanthus minimus (Schltr.) Garay - New Caledonia
- Drymoanthus minutus Nicholls - Queensland
- Drymoanthus neocaledonicus (Rendle) M.A.Clem., D.L.Jones & D.P.Banks - New Caledonia

== See also ==
- List of Orchidaceae genera
