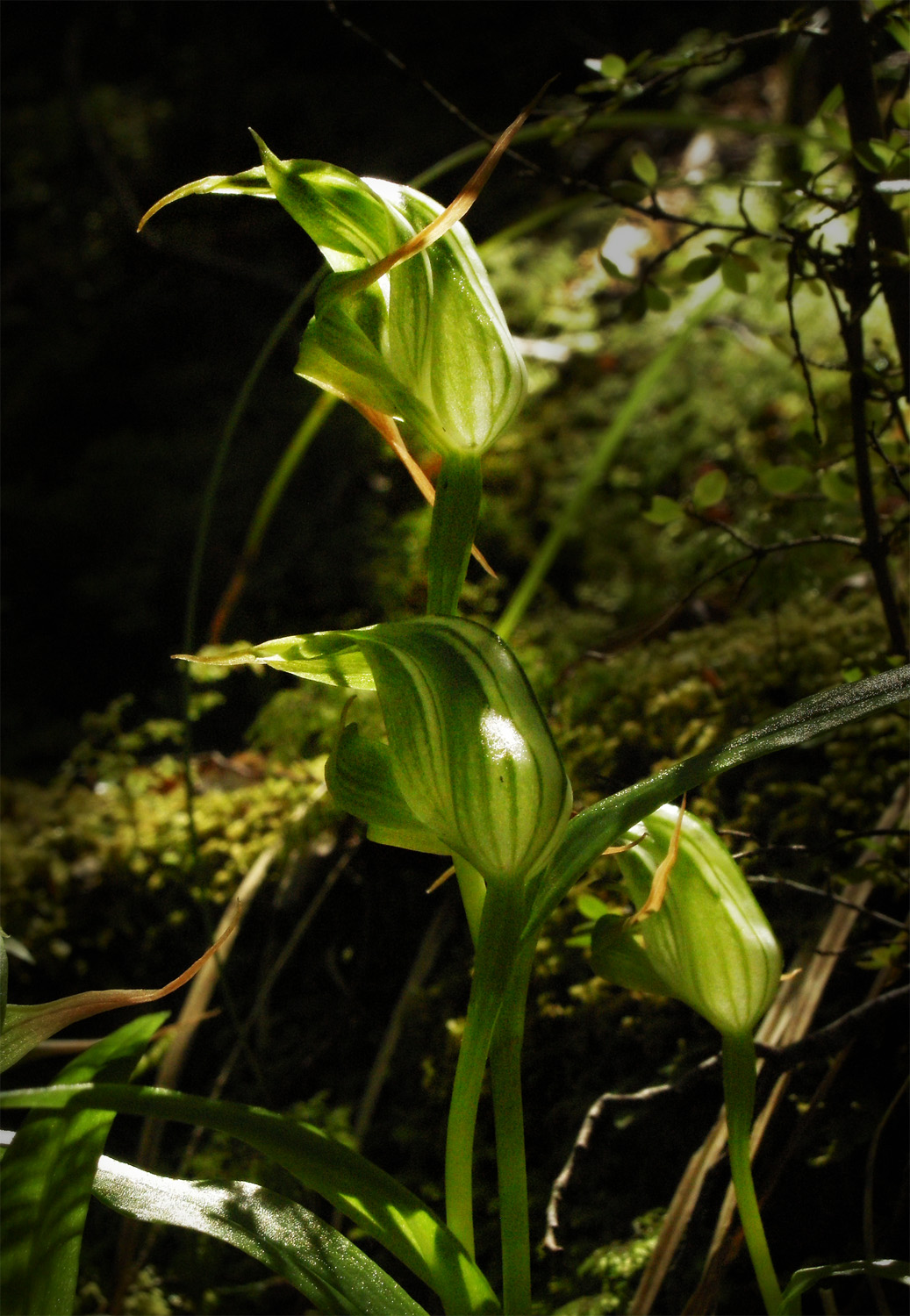
- Pterostylis irsoniana growing near the Routeburn Track

Scientific classification
- Kingdom: Plantae
- Clade: Tracheophytes
- Clade: Angiosperms
- Clade: Monocots
- Order: Asparagales
- Family: Orchidaceae
- Subfamily: Orchidoideae
- Tribe: Cranichideae
- Genus: Pterostylis
- Species: P. irsoniana

Binomial name
- Pterostylis irsoniana Hatch

= Pterostylis irsoniana =

Greenhood

Species of orchid

Pterostylis irsoniana is a species of greenhood orchid endemic to New Zealand. There are up to five erect leaves on the flowering stem with a single dark green flower with white stripes and a reddish tinge on the tips. It has a distinctive curved labellum with a curled tip with a dark red callus.

== Description ==
Pterostylis irsoniana is a terrestrial, perennial, deciduous, herb with an underground tuber and three to five stem leaves increasing in size up to stem where the largest leaf is up to 180 mm (7 in) long and 12 mm (0.5 in) wide. The leaves are linear to lance-shaped, green with a reddish tinge and the uppermost leaf is taller than the flower. There is a single dark green flower with a reddish tinge near the tips borne on a flowering stem up to 350 mm (10 in) tall. The dorsal sepal and petals are fused, forming a hood or "galea" over the column. The dorsal sepal is 15–30 mm (0.6–1 in) long and curves forward with a short-pointed tip. The lateral sepals are erect, in close contact with the galea with their tips spreading apart slightly from each other. The labellum is gently curved then suddenly curls downward at its tip with a dark red or blackish callus. Flowering occurs from October to January.

== Taxonomy and naming ==
Pterostylis irsoniana was first formally described in 1950 by Edwin Hatch from a specimen collected at 1,160 m (3,810 ft) in the Egmont National Park. The description was published in Transactions and Proceedings of the Royal Society of New Zealand. The specific epithet (irsoniana) is a derived from the names of J. Bruce Irwin and O.E. Gibson "who between them have done much to elucidate the orchid flora of Mount Egmont".

== Distribution and habitat ==
This greenhood grows in grass and montane forests of Nothofagus and subalpine Podocarpus scrub, often in deep leaf litter or on the edge of bogs. In the North Island it occurs from East Cape to Wellington and in the South Island on the western side as far south as Haast.
