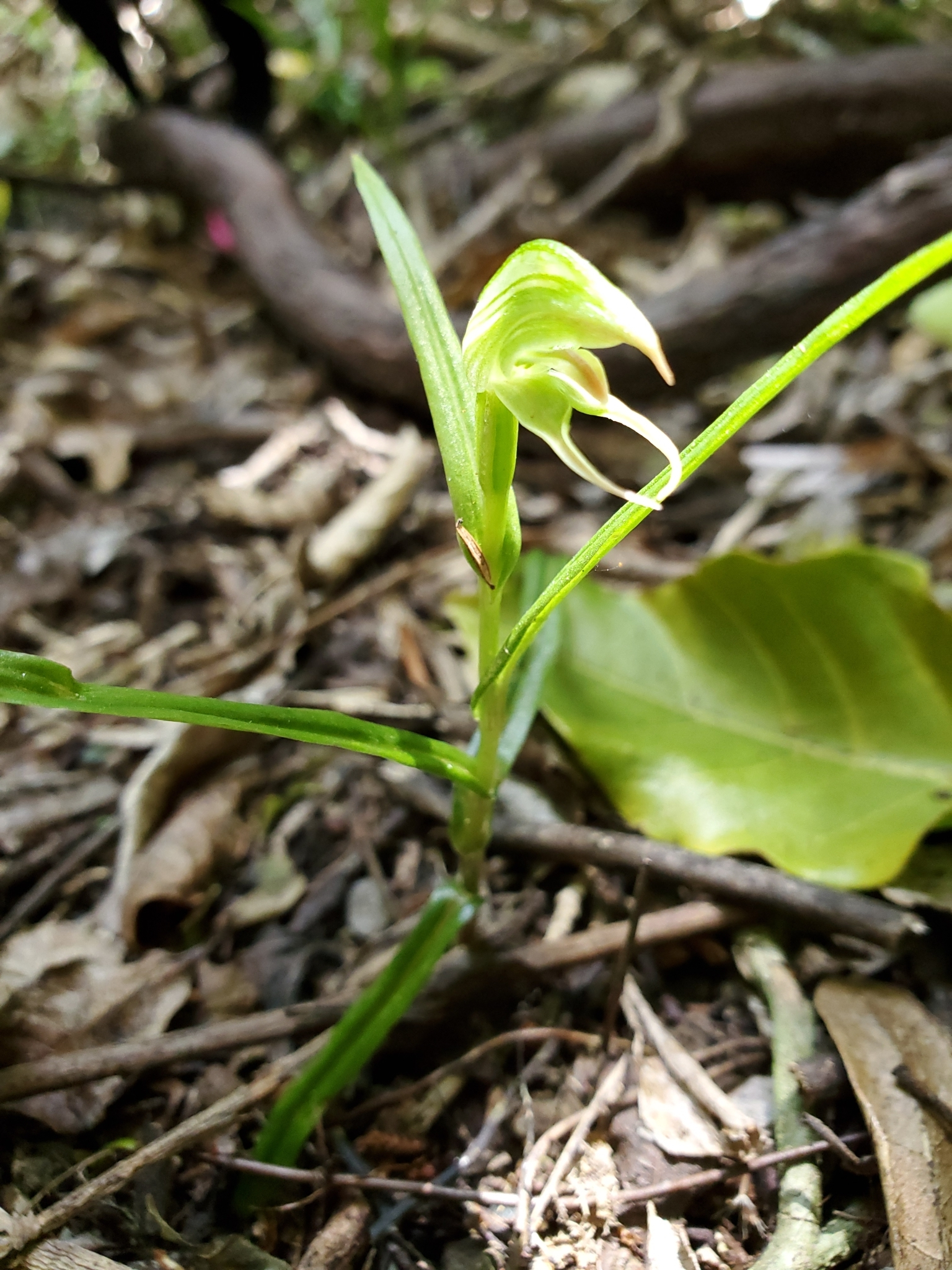

Conservation status
- Naturally Uncommon (NZ TCS)

Scientific classification
- Kingdom: Plantae
- Clade: Tracheophytes
- Clade: Angiosperms
- Clade: Monocots
- Order: Asparagales
- Family: Orchidaceae
- Subfamily: Orchidoideae
- Tribe: Cranichideae
- Genus: Pterostylis
- Species: P. porrecta

Binomial name
- Pterostylis porrecta D.L.Jones, Molloy & M.A.Clem.

= Pterostylis porrecta =

Shrimp-flowered greenhood

Species of orchid

Pterostylis porrecta is a species of greenhood orchid endemic to New Zealand. Flowering plants have spreading, grass-like leaves on the flowering stem and a single small, transparent white and green flower with the lateral sepals held close to horizontally in front of the flower.

== Description ==
Pterostylis porrecta is a terrestrial, perennial, deciduous, herb with an underground tuber. Non-flowering plant have a rosette of three or four linear to lance-shaped, dark green leaves which are 40–70 mm (2–3 in) long and 4–6 mm (0.16–0.24 in) wide. Flowering plants have a single transparent white flower with green lines and 18–22 mm (0.7–0.9 in) long on a flowering stem 60–200 mm (2–8 in) tall. There are also four or five linear to lance-shaped leaves 45–120 mm (2–5 in) long and 4–6 mm (0.16–0.24 in) wide with their bases wrapped around the flowering stem. The flower leans forward and the dorsal sepal and petals are fused, forming a hood or "galea" over the column. There is a wide gap between the galea and the lateral sepals which have long, tapering tips, spread apart from each other and held almost horizontally in front of the flower. The labellum is gently curved, greenish with a pink tip and does not protrude through the sinus between the lateral sepals. Flowering occurs in December and January.

== Taxonomy and naming ==
Pterostylis porrecta was first formally described in 1997 by David Jones, Brian Molloy and Mark Clements and the description was published in The Orchadian. The specific epithet (porrecta) is a Latin word meaning "spread out" or "stretched.

== Distribution and habitat ==
The shrimp-flowered greenhood usually grows in deep shade in forest and scrub. There are scattered populations on both the North and South Islands.

== Conservation status ==
As at 2023, Pterostylis porrecta is classed as "at risk – naturally uncommon" under the New Zealand Threat Classification System. This species is regarded as being "endangered" in the Wellington Region as at December 2025.
