= Waimarino =

Waimarino is the official name of the town formerly known from 1926 to 2024 as National Park, New Zealand.

Waimarino may also refer to the following in New Zealand:

- Waimarino (electorate), a former electorate centred on Waimarino
- Waimarino County, a former territorial local authority
- Waimarino district, an area at the foot of Mount Ruapehu
- Waimarino River, in the Waikato Region

== See also ==
- Waimarino Museum, in Raetihi, New Zealand
