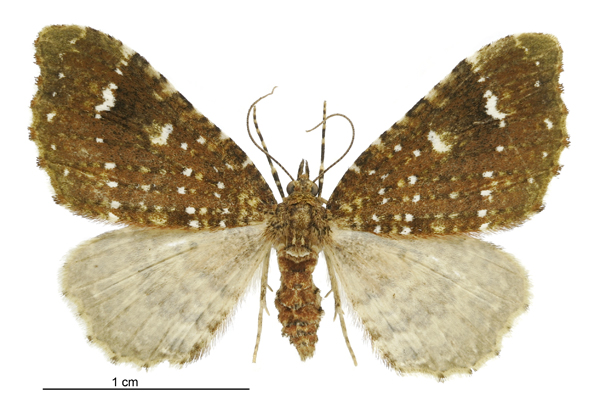
- Female
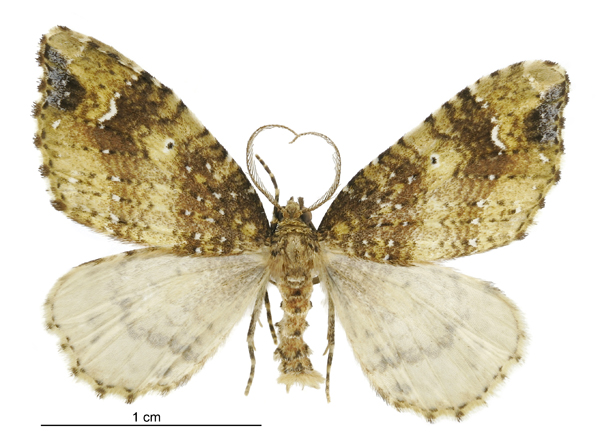
- Male

Scientific classification
- Kingdom: Animalia
- Phylum: Arthropoda
- Clade: Pancrustacea
- Class: Insecta
- Order: Lepidoptera
- Family: Geometridae
- Genus: Asaphodes
- Species: A. limonodes

Binomial name
- Asaphodes limonodes (Meyrick, 1888)

Synonyms
- Epyaxa limonodes Meyrick, 1888; Xanthorhoe limonodes (Meyrick, 1888); Larentia limonodes (Meyrick, 1887)

= Asaphodes limonodes =

Species of moth

Asaphodes limonodes is a species of moth in the family Geometridae. It is endemic to New Zealand and is found in both the North and South Islands. This species inhabits damp native forest. Adults are on the wing from November until March.

== Taxonomy ==
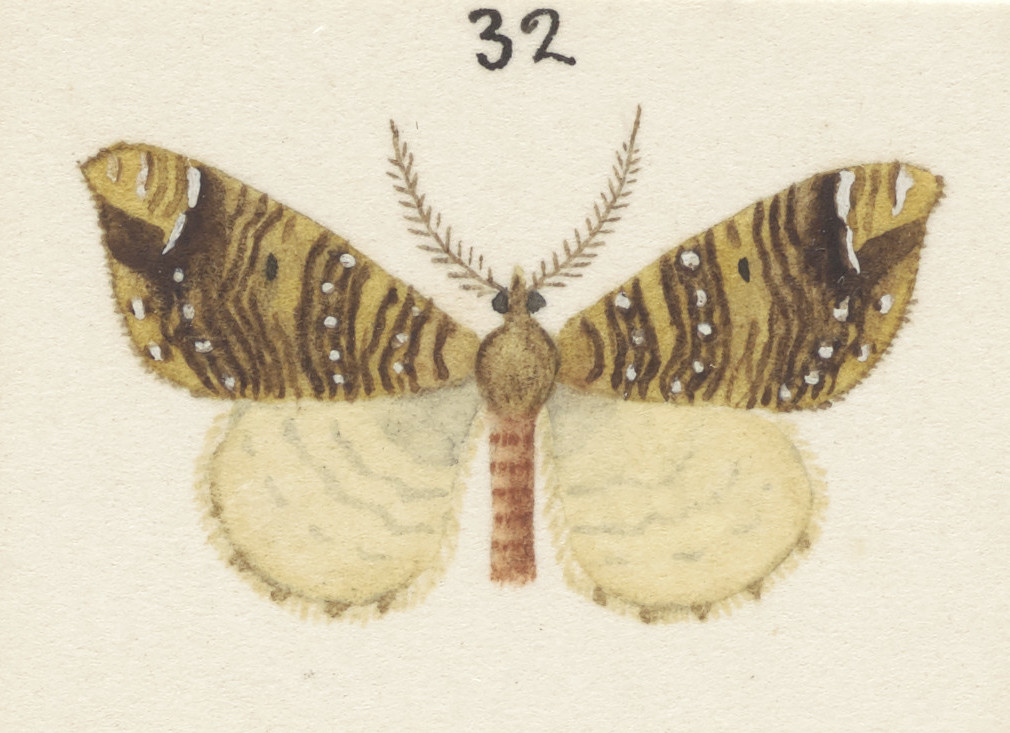
Illustration of male A. limonodes by George Hudson.

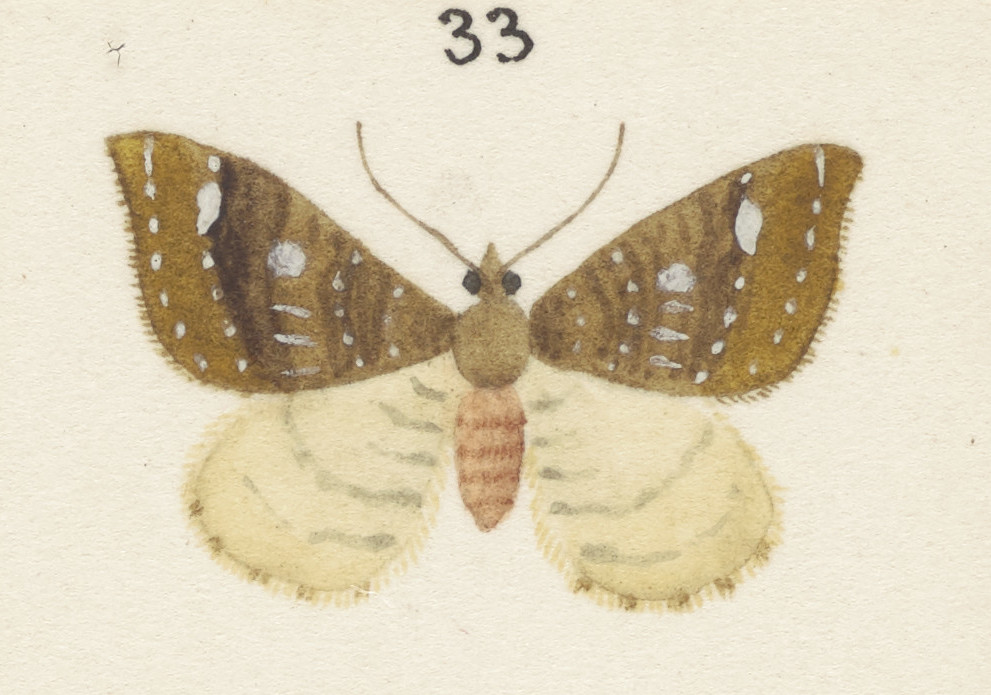
Illustration of female A. limonodes by George Hudson.

This species was described by Edward Meyrick in 1888 as Epyaxa limonodes using material collected by George Hudson in Wellington. Hudson discussed and illustrated this species in 1898 as Xanthorhoe limonodes. He also discussed and illustrated this moth under this same name in his 1928 book The Butterflies and Moths of New Zealand. In 1939 Louis Beethoven Prout placed this species in the genus Larentia. This placement was not accepted by New Zealand taxonomists. In 1971 J. S. Dugdale placed this species within the genus Asaphodes. In 1988 Dugdale confirmed this placement. The lectotype specimen is held at the Natural History Museum, London.

== Description ==
Meyrick described the species as follows:

Male. — 25-26 mm. Head and thorax light ochreous-yellowish, somewhat sprinkled with dark fuscous. Palpi fuscous. Antennae pale greyish-ochreous. Abdomen pale yellow-ochreous, segmental margins dotted with blackish. Legs dark fuscous, apex of joints pale yellowish, posterior pair suffused with whitish-yellowish. Forewings with costa strongly arched on posterior half, hindmargin sinuate, somewhat oblique; light ochreous-yellowish; a basal patch of closely placed fuscous transverse lines; four series of white dots on veins, preceded and followed by black dots; first curved, within edge of basal patch; second from 1/3 of costa to 2/5 of inner margin, followed by two fuscous lines; third front beyond 2/3 of costa to 3/4 of inner margin, rather angulated in middle, sinuate inwards above middle, preceded by three obscure fuscous lines coalescing to form a small cloudy dark patch above middle; all fuscous lines terminating in black dots on costa; a black discal dot in middle; fourth series subterminal; a subtriangular dark fuscous blotch on hindmargin beneath apex; cilia light ochreous-yellowish, tips white. Hindwings and cilia wholly pale whitish-ochreous.

== Distribution ==
This species is endemic to New Zealand. This species has been found in both the North and South Islands at Waimarino, Ohakune, Mount Taranaki, Wellington, Buller River, Otira, Poherua and Lake Wakatipu.

== Biology and life cycle ==
This species is on the wing from November until March.

== Habitat and host plant ==
A. limonodes prefers damp forest habitat.
