= George Hill (agronomist) =

New Zealand agronomist

George Hill RD VRD JP
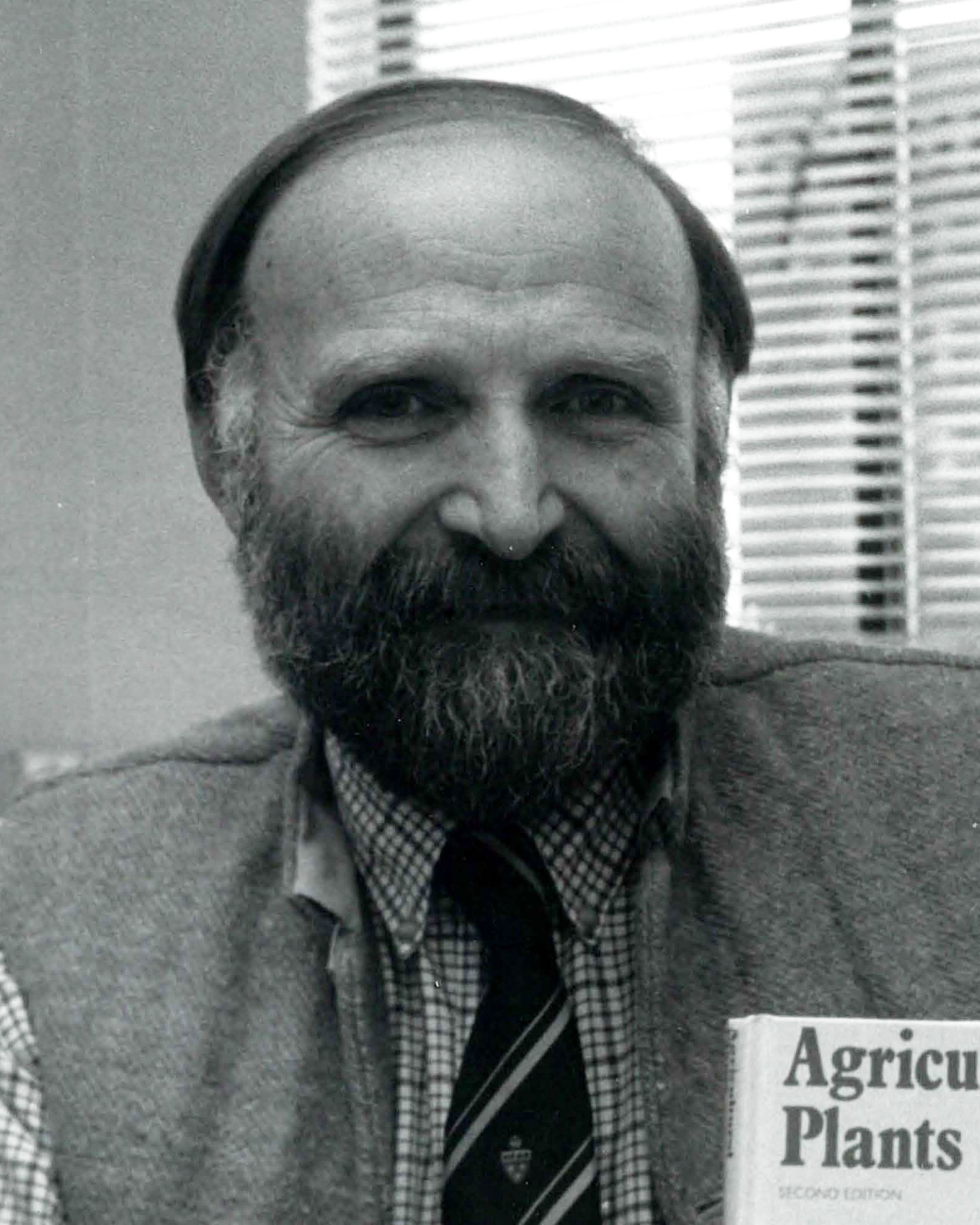
- Hill in 1991
- Born: 16 June 1938; Wallsend, Northumberland, England
- Died: 17 July 2017 (aged 79); Christchurch, New Zealand
- Education: University of Western Australia
- Scientific career
- Fields: Agronomy
- Workplaces: Lincoln University

George Darvel Hill RD VRD JP (16 June 1938 – 17 July 2017) was a New Zealand agronomist, naval reservist, and a justice of the peace and unionist.

== Early life and education ==
Born in Wallsend, Northumberland, England on 16 June 1938, Hill was the son of a master mariner. He was educated at Christ Church Grammar School in Perth, Western Australia, from 1949 to 1956, and later completed a Master of Science in agriculture in at the University of Western Australia in 1969. The title of his master's thesis was Effect of environment on the growth of Leucaena leucocephala.

== Academic career ==
Hill spent four years from 1965 as an agricultural researcher at Bubia, near Lae, in Papua New Guinea. He was appointed to an academic position at Lincoln University, near Christchurch, New Zealand, in October 1972. He rose to become an associate professor, and served as head of the Agronomy Department at Lincoln from 1994. After 40 years as a teaching and research agronomist with a particular interest in the agronomy of lupins, Hill retired in 2012.

Hill served a committee member of the Association of University Staff (AUS) and later the Tertiary Education Union for 28 years, rising to national president and earning a meritorious service award. He was also a long-serving member of the council of the Agronomy Society of New Zealand, and was appointed a justice of the peace in 1984.

== Naval service ==
Following his secondary education, Hill joined the Royal Australian Naval Reserve in November 1956. He was active in the naval reserves in Australia and New Zealand for more than 30 years, becoming the first reservist raised to the rank of captain in 25 years.

In 1975 he was appointed honorary aide-de-camp to the New Zealand governor-general, Sir Denis Blundell.

== Death ==
Hill died in Christchurch on 17 July 2017.

== Selected works ==
- Langer, Reinhart Hugo Michael; Hill, G.D. (1991). Agricultural plants (2nd ed.). Cambridge University Press. ISBN 0-521-40545-9.
- Hove, E.L.; King, S.; Hill, G.D. (1978). "Composition, protein quality, and toxins of seeds of the grain legumes Glycine max, Lupinus spp., Phaseolus spp. Pisum sativum, and Vicia faba". New Zealand Journal of Agricultural Research. 21 (3): 457–462. doi:10.1080/00288233.1978.10427434.
- Herbert, S.J.; Hill, G.D. (1978). "Growth analysis of Lupinus angustifolius cv.'WAU11B'". New Zealand Journal of Agricultural Research. 21 (3): 467–474. doi:10.1080/00288233.1978.10427436.
- Gladstones, S.J.; Hill, G.D. (1969). "Selection for economic characters in Lupinus angustifolius and L. digitatus. 2. Time of flowering". Animal Production Science. 9 (37): 213–220. doi:10.1071/EA9690213.
