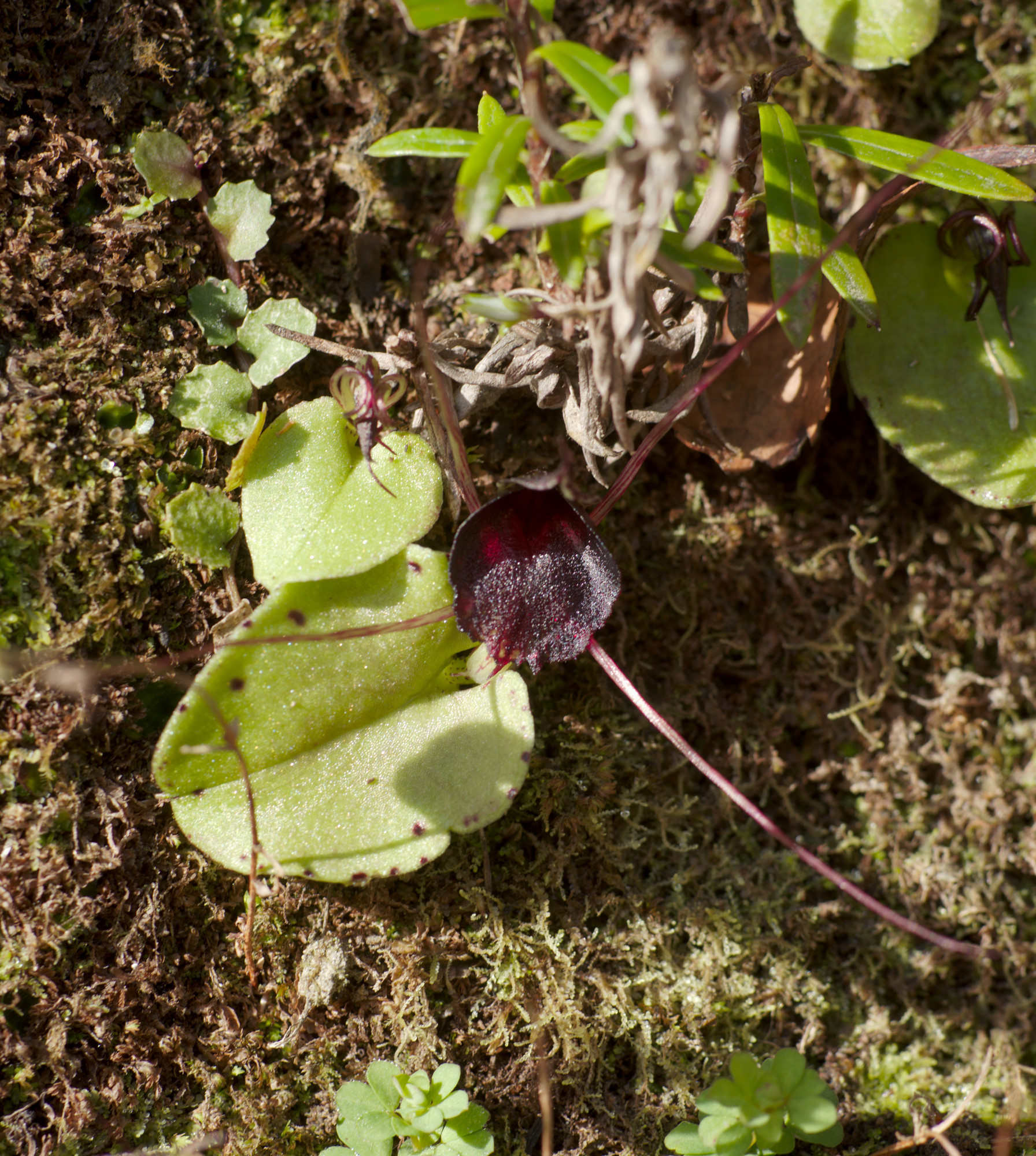
- Corybas iridescens near Whanganui

Scientific classification
- Kingdom: Plantae
- Clade: Embryophytes
- Clade: Tracheophytes
- Clade: Angiosperms
- Clade: Monocots
- Order: Asparagales
- Family: Orchidaceae
- Subfamily: Orchidoideae
- Tribe: Diurideae
- Genus: Corybas
- Species: C. iridescens

Binomial name
- Corybas iridescens Irwin & Molloy

Synonyms
- Corysanthes iridescens (Irwin & Molloy) Szlach.; Nematoceras iridescens (Irwin & Molloy) Molloy, D.L.Jones & M.A.Clem.

= Corybas iridescens =

Species of orchid

Corybas iridescens is a species of terrestrial orchid endemic to the New Zealand. It has a solitary fleshy oval-shaped leaf and a single deep crimson flower, sometimes accompanied with green, with a tapering dorsal sepal.

== Description ==
Corybas iridescens is a terrestrial, perennial herb with a solitary fleshy oval-shaped leaf born on a very short petiole. The midrib of the leaf is grooved, and the base may be slightly heart-shaped. The leaf is green on the upper surface, sometimes spotted with maroon, and the surface underneath is silvery. The ovary is curved and is accompanied by two slender floral bracts of unequal length; the shorter one is reduced and points towards the leaf, while the longer is at least the length of the ovary and points away from the leaf. The dorsal sepal is long and extends well past the labellum and is oval-shaped when flattened, although the apex often ends in a rather long, sharp tip, which is curved slightly upwards. It is silvery green spotted or striped with purple or may be entirely deep crimson. The lateral sepals are long and filiform (thread-like), pointing forwards and much longer than the labellum, and are translucent white with purple flecking. The petals are similar but are slightly shorter; they are also lobed at the base. The labellum is deep crimson (although rare pale green individuals have been recorded) and iridescent when wet. Its lower portion may be translucent, in which case it is still heavily flecked with crimson. It forms a tubelike structure near its base that abruptly curves downwards, flattens out, and expands to form the portion visible from the front of the flower, which is called the lamina. The labellum has a bead-shaped callus placed near the bend. The lamina is oval-shaped or circular, and its upper borders are folded inwards. The tip ends in an abrupt sharp point. The inner portions of the labellum are covered with ridges and small recurved projections. The column is broad at the base and tilted backwards; there are four pollinia in two pairs. Flowering occurs from October to January. The peduncle elongates greatly as the capsule ripens.

C. iridescens is similar to C. macranthus but can be distinguished by its leaves, which are carried on short petioles and often spotted, and its broader dorsal sepal (C. macranthus has a very slender dorsal sepal), as well as its labellum, which has a prominent callus and is almost always uniformly deep crimson or nearly black and iridescent when wet. C. iridescens also flowers earlier than C. macranthus.

== Taxonomy ==
The type specimen of Corybas iridescens was collected in Ruatiti in a roadside bank at 240 m in 1992 by James Bruce Irwin and Brian Molloy. It was then described under the name Corybas iridescens in 1996. The species was separated from a group of highly similar species, then known as the C. rivularis complex. The specific epithet (iridescens), meaning "becoming iridescent", refers to the distinctive iridescence of the labellum, and to some extent, the dorsal sepal, when the flowers are wet.

In 2002, Brian Molloy, David Jones, and Mark Clements transferred the species into the genus Nematoceras under the name Nematoceras iridescens. In 2003, Dariusz Szlachetko attempted to transfer the species to the genus Corysanthes, but the change was not widely recognized and the species remained within Nematoceras. However, in a 2014 dissertation that analyzed DNA markers from Corybas species occurring from the Himalayas to New Zealand, Stephanie Lyon indicated that Nematoceras and other genera that Molloy, Jones, and Clements had segregated ought to be returned to Corybas. Since then, the World Checklist of Selected Plant Families and the New Zealand Department of Conservation has recognized these changes, and N. iridescens returned to its original name, Corybas iridescens.

== Distribution and habitat ==
Corybas iridescens is endemic to the North Island, South Island, and Chatham Islands of New Zealand; at the time of its publication, it was only known from western-central North Island localities, including Taranaki and Whanganui. It grows in coastal to montane habitats in calcium-rich substrates such as those consisting of mudstone and siltstone (known locally as papa rock), as well as limestone; it also grows in basaltic substrates. It usually grows near seepages or on the banks of slow-flowing streams.

== Gallery ==
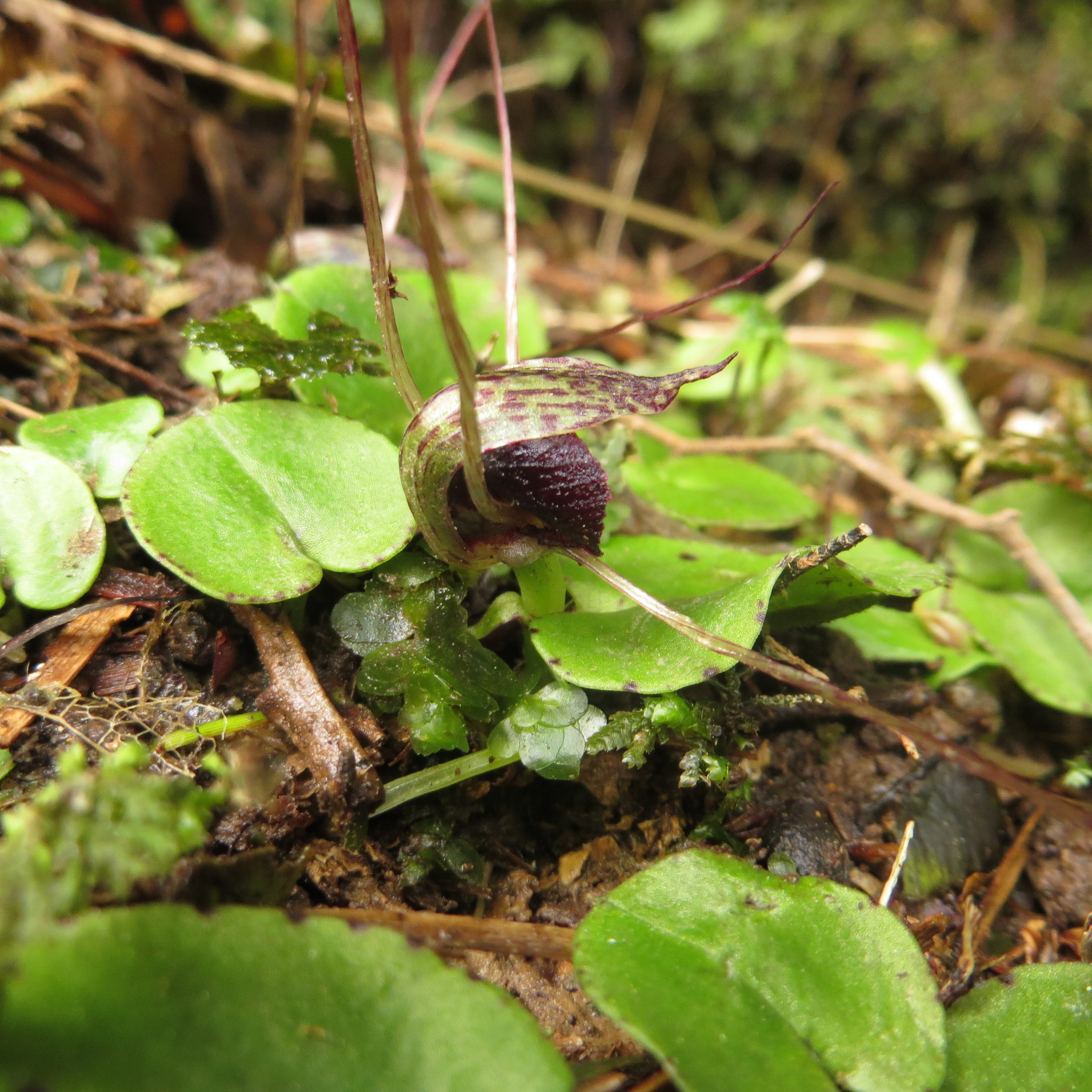
Side viewing showing relative lengths of caudate dorsal sepal and labellum.

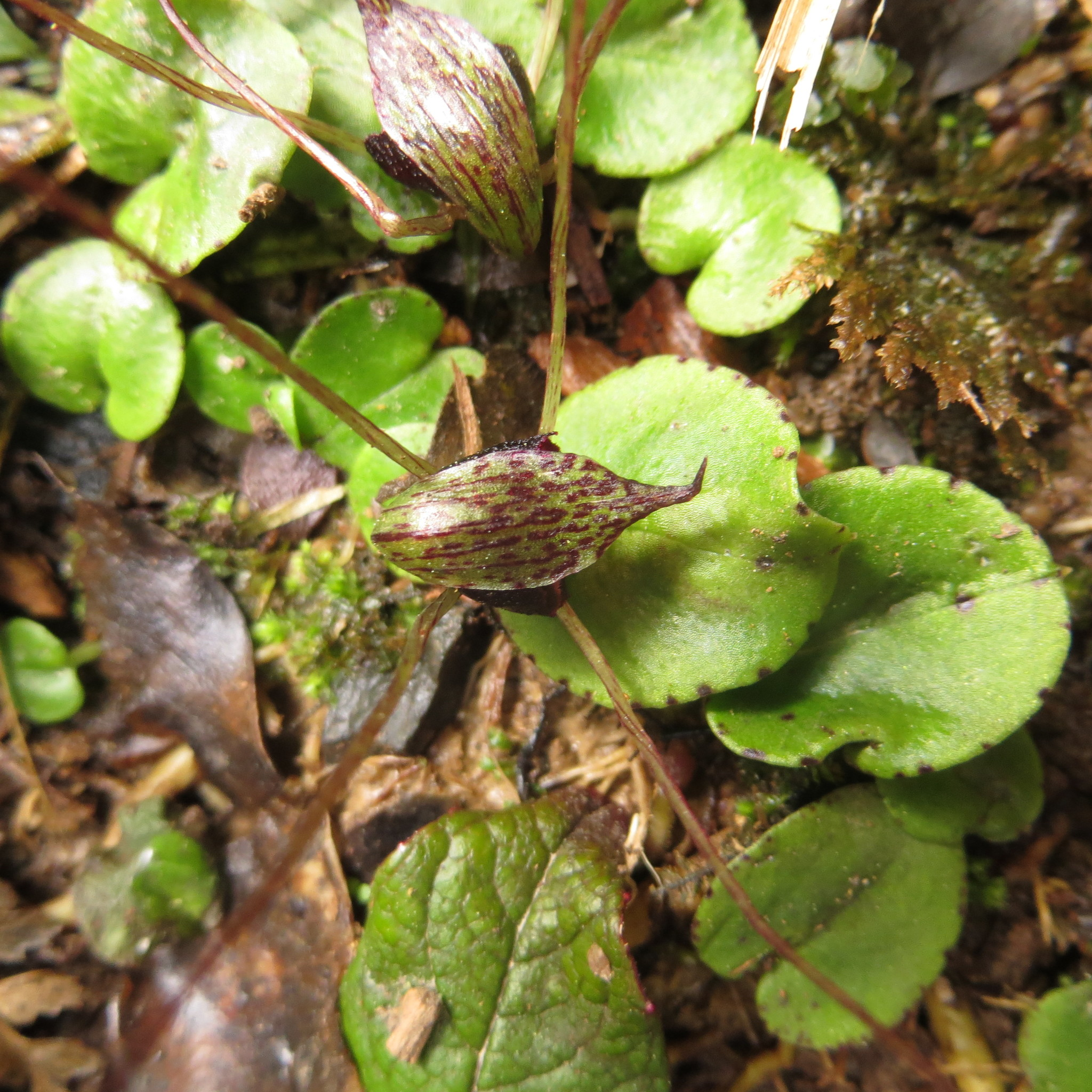
Upper view showing oval dorsal sepal with caudate apex.

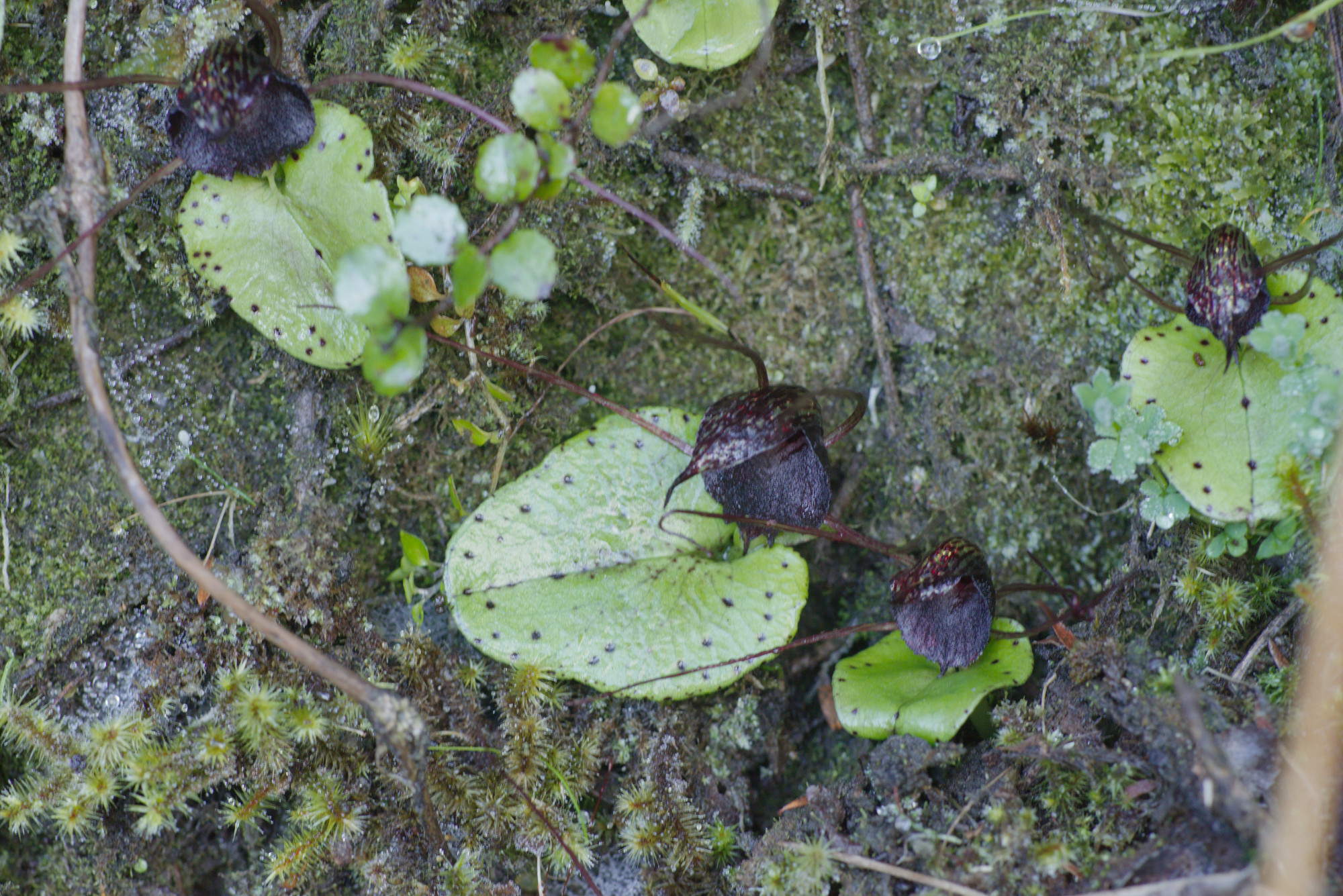
Corybas iridescens in situ with caudate dorsal sepal.

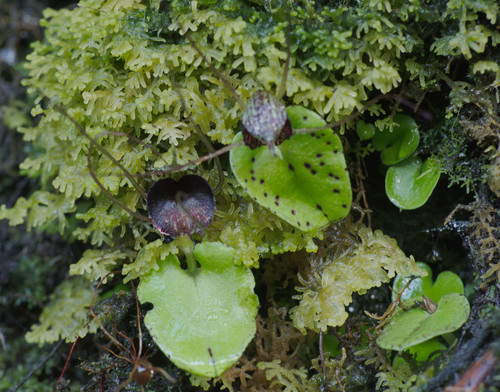
Corybas iridescens displaying clear iridescence and oval-shaped dorsal sepal .

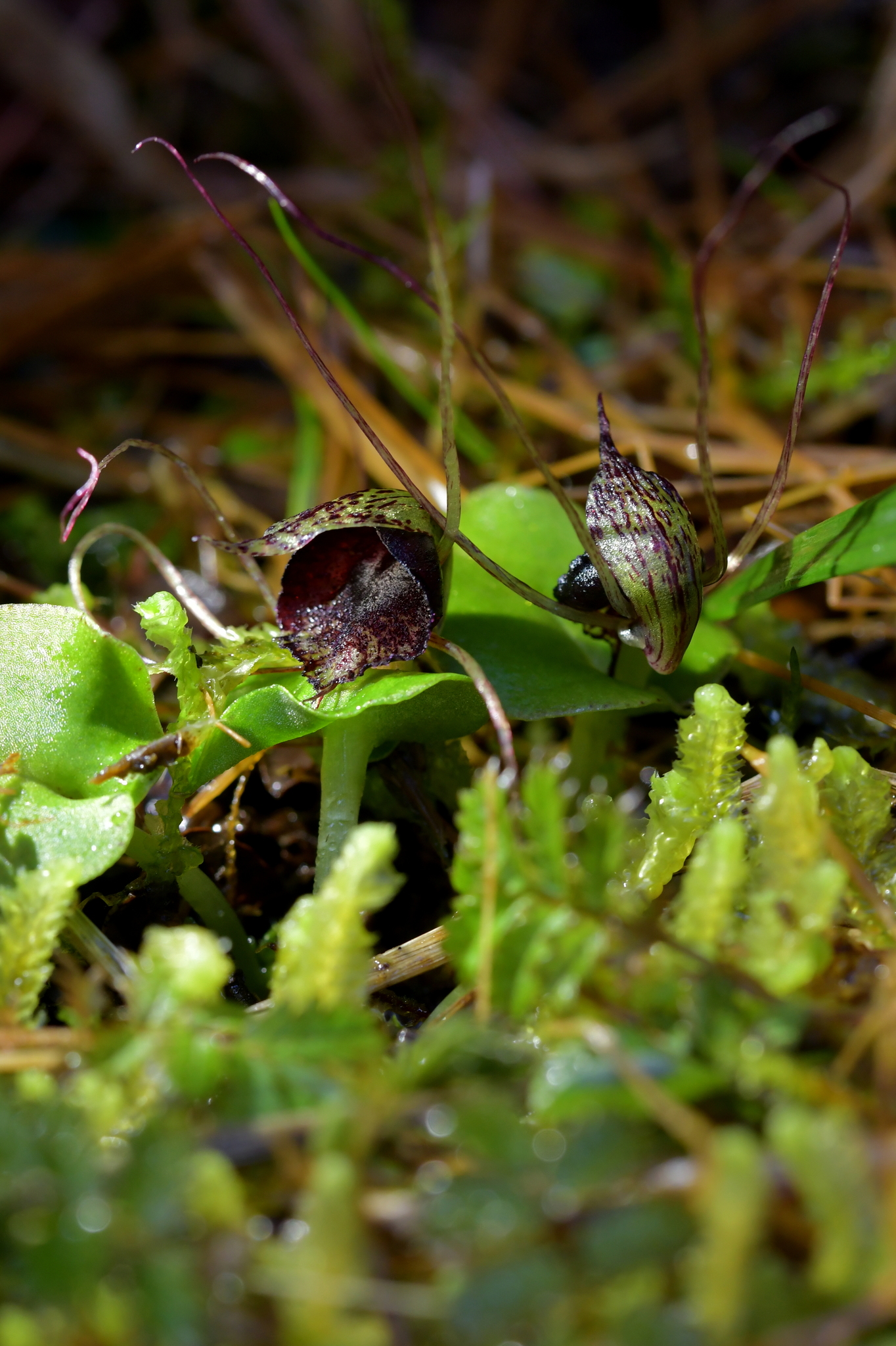
Corybas iridescens with oval dorsal sepal and slightly transparent labellum lower margin. Note the abrupt point on the labellum tip; refer to the taxobox image as well.
