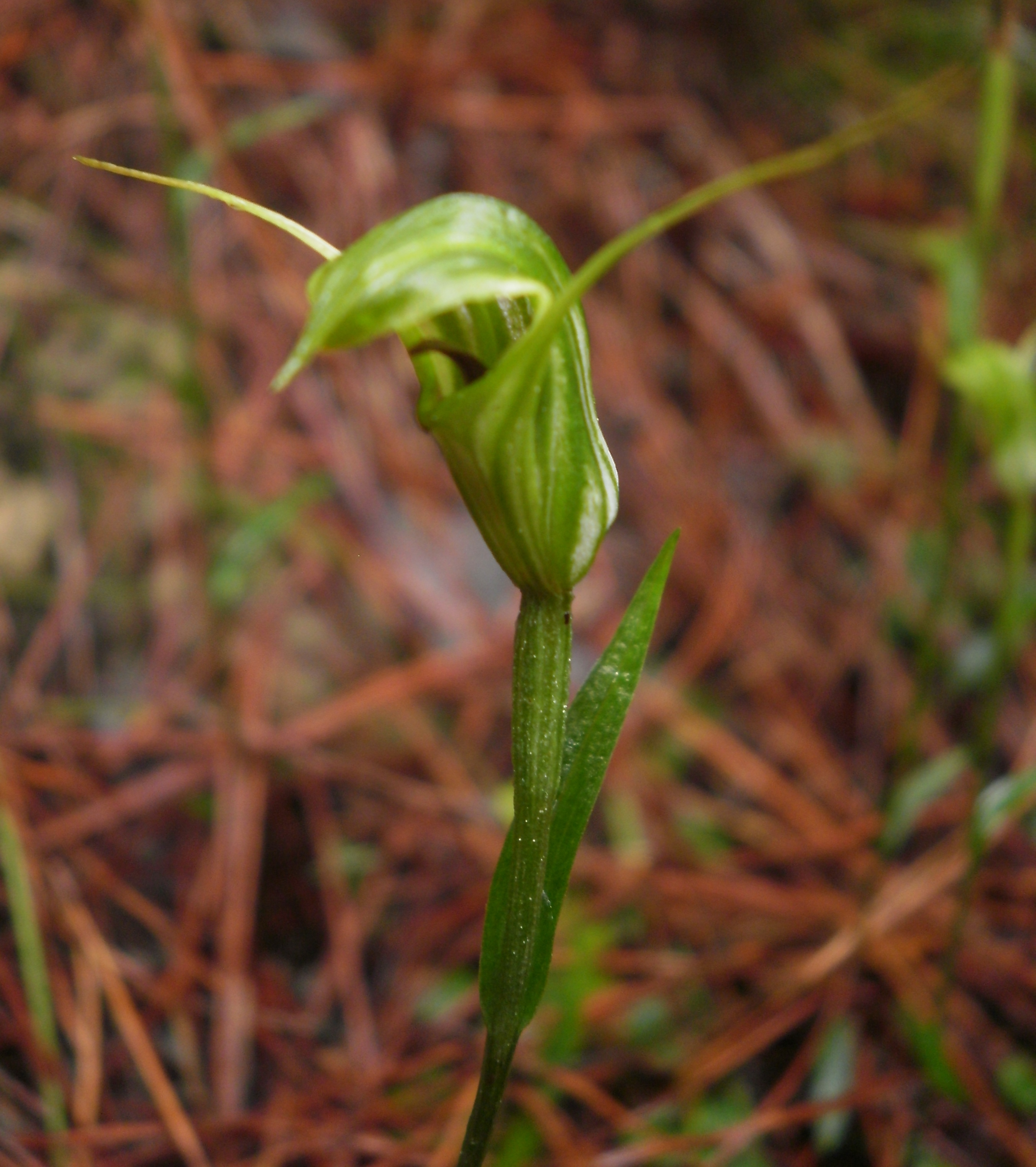
- Pterostylis trullifolia growing near Upper Hutt

Scientific classification
- Kingdom: Plantae
- Clade: Tracheophytes
- Clade: Angiosperms
- Clade: Monocots
- Order: Asparagales
- Family: Orchidaceae
- Subfamily: Orchidoideae
- Tribe: Cranichideae
- Genus: Pterostylis
- Species: P. trullifolia

Binomial name
- Pterostylis trullifolia Hook.f.

Synonyms
- Diplodium trullifolium (Hook.f.) D.L.Jones, Molloy & M.A.Clem.

= Pterostylis trullifolia =

Trowel-leaved greenhood

Species of orchid

Pterostylis trullifolia, commonly known as the trowel-leaved greenhood, is an orchid species endemic to New Zealand. As with similar orchids, the flowering plants differ from those which are not flowering. The non-flowering plants have a rosette of wrinkled, trowel-shaped leaves but the flowering plants have a single flower with a bulging, platform-like sinus between the lateral sepals and leaves on the flowering spike.

== Description ==
Pterostylis trullifolia is a terrestrial, perennial, deciduous, herb with an underground tuber and when not flowering, a rosette of dark green to reddish-green, wrinkled, trowel-shaped leaves, 5–10 mm (0.2–0.4 in) long and wide with a petiole up to 10 mm (0.4 in) long. Flowering plants have a single green and white-striped flower on a flowering stem up to 300 mm (10 in) high with between two and eight spreading stem leaves. The stem leaves are 5–20 mm (0.2–0.8 in) long and 2–5 mm (0.08–0.2 in) wide. The dorsal sepal and petals are fused, forming a hood or "galea" over the column, the dorsal sepal curving forward with a short-pointed tip. The lateral sepals are held closely against the galea and have erect, thread-like tips much taller than the gales. There is a bulging U-shaped sinus between the bases of the lateral sepals. The labellum is dark brown to reddish-brown and protrudes above the sinus. Flowering occurs from May to September.

== Taxonomy and naming ==
Pterostylis trullifolia was first formally described in 1853 by Joseph Dalton Hooker and the description was published in The Botany of the Antarctic Voyage of H.M. Discovery Ships Erebus and Terror in the years 1839–1843, under the Command of Captain Sir James Clark Ross. The specific epithet (trullifolia) is derived from the Latin words trulla meaning "trowel" and folia meaning "leaves".

== Distribution and habitat ==
The trowel-leaved greenhood occurs from coastal to montane forests at altitudes of up to 1,100 m (4,000 ft). It sometimes invades rough pasture and lawns near forests. It is widespread on the North Island and Three Kings Islands and on the South Island north of Canterbury.
