= Drymoanthus minutus =

Green midget orchid

Scientific classification
- Kingdom: Plantae
- Clade: Tracheophytes
- Clade: Angiosperms
- Clade: Monocots
- Order: Asparagales
- Family: Orchidaceae
- Subfamily: Epidendroideae
- Genus: Drymoanthus
- Species: D. minutus

Binomial name
- Drymoanthus minutus Nicholls

Species of orchid

Drymoanthus minutus, commonly known as green midget orchid, is a species of epiphytic or lithophytic orchid that forms small clumps with many thick roots emerging from a thin, erect stem. Between two and five dark green, leathery leaves are arranged along the stem and up to seven minute green to yellowish, star-shaped flowers are arranged on a stiff flowering stem. The sepals and petals are similar to each other and there is a fleshy white, unlobed labellum. This orchid occurs in northern Queensland where it grows in rainforest, usually at higher altitudes.

== Description ==
Drymoanthus minutus is an epiphytic or lithophytic herb that forms small clumps and has erect stems 20–40 millimetres (0.79–1.6 in) long with many thick roots. Between two and five leathery, dark green, oblong to elliptic leaves 30–50 millimetres (1.2–2.0 in) long, 6–10 millimetres (0.24–0.39 in) wide are crowded together with their bases overlapping. Up to seven green to yellowish, resupinate, star-like flowers about 2.5 millimetres (0.098 in) long and wide are arranged along a stiff flowering stem 10–25 millimetres (0.39–0.98 in) long. The sepals and petals are fleshy, narrow lance-shaped, about 2.5 millimetres (0.098 in) long, 1 millimetre (0.039 in) wide although the petals are slightly shorter and narrower. The labellum is white, about 2 millimetres (0.079 in) long and 1 millimetre (0.039 in) wide, fleshy and channeled but unlobed. Flowering occurs from December to February.

== Taxonomy and naming ==
Drymoanthus minutus was first formally described in 1943 by William Henry Nicholls and the description was published in The Victorian Naturalist. The specific epithet (minutus) is a Latin word meaning "little" or "small", referring to "the diminutive character of the plant".

== Distribution and habitat ==
The green midget orchid grows on trees and rocks in rainforest near streams, often on twigs of bottlebrush shrubs. It is found between Cairns and Townsville, usually at altitudes between 100 and 850 metres (330 and 2,800 ft).
