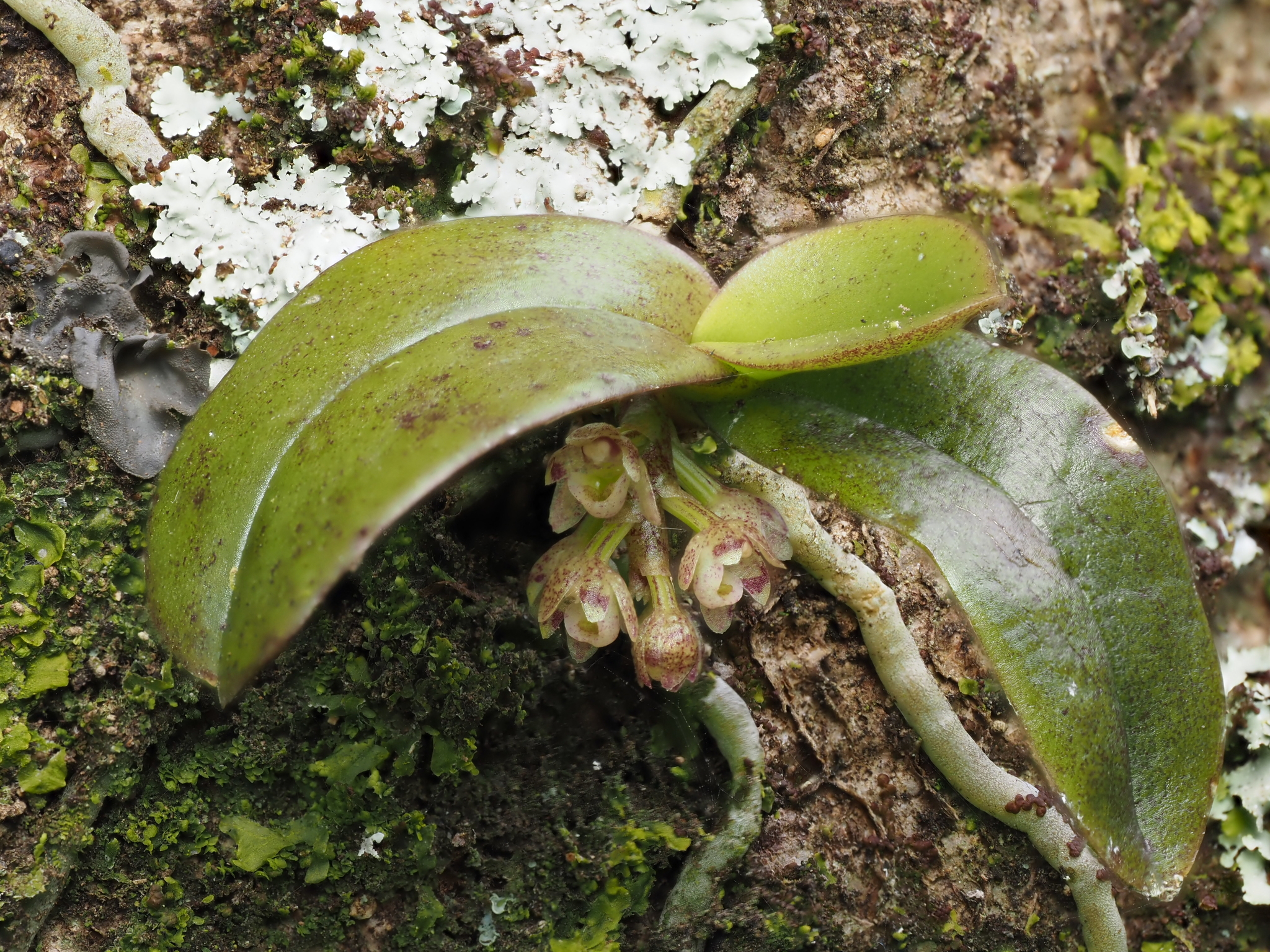

Conservation status
- Not Threatened (NZ TCS)

Scientific classification
- Kingdom: Plantae
- Clade: Tracheophytes
- Clade: Angiosperms
- Clade: Monocots
- Order: Asparagales
- Family: Orchidaceae
- Subfamily: Epidendroideae
- Genus: Drymoanthus
- Species: D. adversus

Binomial name
- Drymoanthus adversus (Hook.f.) Dockrill

Synonyms
- Newzealochilus adversus (Hook.f.) R.Rice; Sarcochilus adversus Hook.f.; Thrixspermum adversum (Hook.f.) Rchb.f.

= Drymoanthus adversus =

Species of plant

Drymoanthus adversus is an orchid species endemic to New Zealand.

== Description ==
The plant morphology of Drymoanthus adversus resembles a small cluster of spider plants with a diameter of approximately 4–15 centimeters, but its leaves are more juicy and thick, and the number of leaves is sparse, with very loose spacing between them, resembling a mini version of Moth Orchids. Its leaves are thick dark green with occasional purple spots. The leaves are always elliptical or round in shape, with sharp tips at the end. The leaves are divided in half by a deep vein, and the overall shape of the leaves is not flat, but slightly twisted. Its leaf arrangement is alternate, with the overall leaves appearing in a "V" shape. The base of the leaves is connected to the leaf sheath along a clearly defined abscission line, and the old leaves are slightly drooping.

The stem of D. adversus is very short, usually only 5 cm long, and a fleshy aerial root fixed plant will grow on the old stem that has fallen off the leaves. Its root color is emerald green to grayish white, and the aerial roots can grow very long. The root system is mostly radiating and closely attached to the bark. The inflorescence of D. adversus grow opposite to the tip of the plant, often drooping down into a raceme, which is 80 millimeters long, with (16–20) flowers. The flowers are green or greenish white, dotted with flowers. Red, chestnut, or purple in color. Sepals and petals are nearly equal in length, about 3.5x1.5 millimeters. Lips are almost equal in length and wider, very fleshy, ± upright, with a smooth convex outer surface and deep grooves. The middle lobe is free and only serves as a small cup-shaped tip. Successful pollination results in a solid elliptical shape with parallel grooves on the surface and dark purple dots accompanying it.

== Range ==
Only found in New Zealand where it is endemic, Drymoanthus adversusis widely distributed in New Zealand, ranging from the southernmost Stewart Island to the northernmost Motukokako Island/Piercy Island. Even Chatham Island, a small island far from New Zealand, and its surrounding coastal areas and mountainous highlands are distributed, which is incredible. In the North Island, it is mainly distributed in the southernmost and northernmost peninsula, but its distribution has not been found in various small areas centered around National Park, Waipukurau, and Blairlogie. On the South Island, it is mainly distributed along the west coast, mountains and forests from north to south, while on the east coast, the Canterbury Plain is hardly distributed, but a small number of individuals have been observed in Maungati and Dunedin.

== Habitat ==
Drymoanthus adversus often grows in moist forests near rivers or oceans, and chooses tree trunks and branches on ridges shrouded in thin mist or clouds as habitats. The host of Drymoanthus adversus has strong diversity, and grows on various plant surfaces, including the vine Metrosideros fulgens, shrub Lophomyrtus obcordata, and tree fern Dicksonia squarosa. According to Cox & Lehnebach's observations, the number of D. adversus increases with the increase of host surface area. Drymoanthus adversus does not tend to favor specific host species, but rather tends to favor the size of the host, most commonly found on larger trees. D. adversus often grows together with moss lichens on tree trunks, and almost 90% of them come into direct contact with these non-vascular epiphytic plants. Moss also serve as a substrate for orchids to provide moisture, but the lowest proportion of orchids growing in contact with each other is on the shrub Olearia paniculata. Orchid roots typically grow in lichens

== Habit ==
Like most epiphytic orchids, Drymanthus adversus requires an environment with high air humidity and sufficient sunlight, but in addition to the physical environment, the environment provided by organisms cannot be ignored. One of the main physiological characteristics of epiphytic orchids is that they adhere to the surface of other plant stems for survival without stealing host nutrients. Therefore, the outer epidermis of the host is an important environmental factor for epiphytic orchids. The texture of the bark, the age of the host, and chemical substances in the bark that may affect seed germination can all affect their distribution and abundance. However, for Drymanthus adversus, it is not so picky about its host. It can inhabit various tree trunks, and its roots are found intertwined with moss in multiple habitats. Crain hypothesized that moss, as a living substrate for orchids, can provide water for epiphytic orchids and support fungal growth. Fungi are crucial for the germination of orchid seeds, and the habitat preference of orchid mycorrhiza fungi adds another level of complexity to the interaction between orchids and hosts. Orchid seeds and fungi are beneficial for both parties. Orchids provide fungi with sugar, B vitamins, and a safe house, while fungi provide water, minerals, and more than 80% of the plant's carbon needs. Perhaps it is because lichen is a symbiotic body of algae and fungi, similar to mosses, that lichen also helps establish orchid seeds ).

== Potential danger ==
In terms of protection, Drymanthus adversus is classified as not threatened by the New Zealand Threat Classification System.

=== Diseases ===
With the increase of vascular bundle epiphyte species on the host, the incidence rate of Dryoanthus aversus decreases and remains at a low level. It is worth considering that Austropuccinia psidii (G. Winter) Beenken is a disease that spreads rapidly and widely. If the plant host of Myrsinaceae is seriously infected, the developing spots may lead to the deformation of leaves and branches, and the death of branches. In this case, if D. adventius is attached to an infected host tree, then D. adventius risks losing its habitat.

=== Excessive collection ===
Drymanthus adversus may have ornamental value as a horticultural plant, by tying it to wood with water moss and hanging it in a warm, shaded location. It is watered often until new roots grow and stabilize itself. Orchid collectors pose a threat to rare local orchids, and the large-scale collection of orchids can lead to a decrease in species diversity in the original regions.

== Etymology ==
adversus: From the Latin adversus ‘turned towards’, ‘before’ or ‘opposite’. The growth direction of inflorescence of Drymoanthus adversus is opposite to the whole plant.

== Phenology ==
Orchids are unique plants, each with their own unique habitat. They have very little compatibility with their living environment, and their pollination and life cycle are often difficult to understand. Drymoanthus adversus blooms from September to January, and after successful pollination, it will bloom from November to May. The fruit forms from late December to January and matures slowly. Around July, the fruit completely ripens and begins to release seeds. At this time, new racemes will gradually develop and mature in preparation for the next pollination. The release of D. adversus seeds lasts for a long period of time and is assisted by the siphoning effect of the fluff inside the fruit shell. Orchid seeds are very small, and by discarding the cotyledons or endosperm that should have provided nutrients for germination in the seeds and compressing the embryo into small cell clusters without embryonic roots or buds, the cost of seed production is reduced, thereby increasing yield. This allows a large amount of dusty orchid seeds to spread far away with the wind. Perhaps due to the fact that orchid seeds must combine with fungi (possibly multiple fungi or specific fungi) to form symbiotic bodies for germination and development, most seeds will fall off near the parent plant, resulting in a higher survival rate. Many seedlings can be observed to be below the horizontal direction of the branches.
