= Bruce Irwin =

New Zealand botanist (1921–2012)

- Born: James Bruce Irwin; 1921; Whanganui
- Died: 2012
- Occupation(s): botanist, painter, scientific illustrator, botanical illustrator
- Known for: Botanical Illustration
- Scientific career
- Institutions: Te Papa
- Author abbrev. (botany): Irwin

James Bruce Irwin (17 November 1921 – 4 January 2012) was a New Zealand draughtsperson and botanical artist.

== Biography ==
Bruce Irwin was born in 1921 in Whanganui and attended Whanganui Technical College. When World War II began, he was 17 years old and working at the survey department in New Plymouth. He and his friend Sid Gibson used to collect and draw orchids in nearby Egmont National Park. Despite his military service and a year spent in occupied Japan, he carried out a great deal of work with Sid's son Owen Gibson on Mount Taranaki and made many orchid watercolors during the war and in the immediate postwar period.

Irwin later worked for the Cartographic Branch of the Department of Lands and Survey, where his paintings came to the attention of the botanist Lucy Moore. He quit the Cartographic Branch in 1962 and went to live at his camp in Marlborough Sounds. A collaboration with Moore began, which resulted in his illustrating Volume II of the Flora of New Zealand (1970) and The Oxford Book of New Zealand Plants (1978).

By the 1970s, he had taken a part-time job in the Art Department of Otago Medical School. He largely abandoned watercolors for large-scale pencil drawings, which he felt better illustrated botanical points. After 11.5 years of work on illustrations for The Oxford Book of New Zealand Plants, he retired from his job to pursue orchid cultivation in Tauranga.

While in Tauranga, he taught art at the Tauranga Boys' College and contributed to orchid displays for the Tauranga Orchid Society, regularly winning prizes.

In 1986 Irwin contributed illustrations for Clarkson's Vegetation of Egmont National Park, published by the DSIR. He also illustrated the Native Orchid Group's 1990 book The New Zealand Orchids: Natural History and Cultivation. In 2007, Brian Tyler published a book of his orchid drawings.

During the last years of his life, he cultivated orchids at the Te Puna Quarry Park. He received a number of botanical awards, and a species of Pterostylis was named after him, Pterostylis irwinii.
