= Waimarino River =

River in New Zealand

Location
- Country: New Zealand

Physical characteristics
- Source
  - location: Kaimanawa Range
- Mouth
  - location: Lake Taupō
  - coordinates: 38°56′23″S 175°50′54″E
- Length: 26 km (16 mi)

The Waimarino River is a river of the Waikato Region of New Zealand's North Island. It flows northwest from its origins in the Kaimanawa Forest Park to reach the southern shore of Lake Taupō 5 kilometres (3 mi) northeast of Tūrangi.

== See also ==
- List of rivers of New Zealand
