= Brian Molloy (botanist) =

New Zealand rugby player and ecologist (1930–2022)

Brian Molloy ONZM CRSNZ
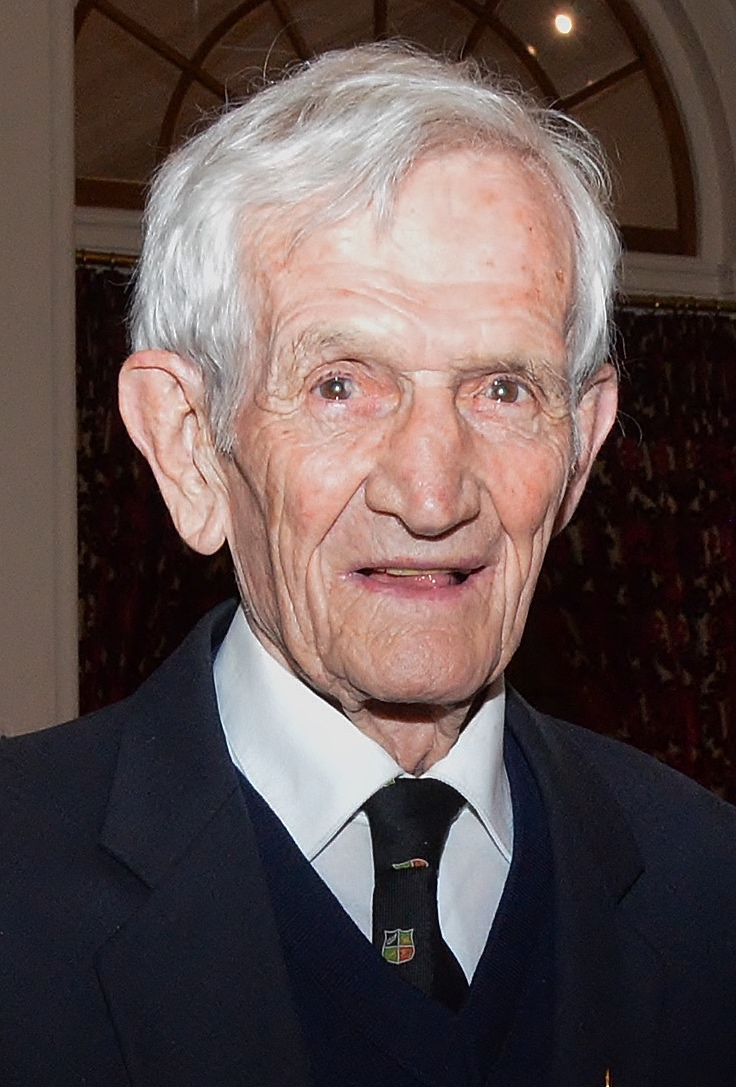
- Molloy in 2017
- Born: Brian Peter John Molloy; 12 August 1930; Wellington, New Zealand
- Died: 31 July 2022 (aged 91); Christchurch, New Zealand
- Education: Marist Brothers' High School, Palmerston North; Canterbury University College (BSc, MSc); Lincoln College (PhD)
- Spouse: Barbara Anita O'Neill (m. 1957; died 2017)
- Children: 4
- Scientific career
- Workplaces: Department of Agriculture; Landcare Research
- Thesis: The autecology of sweet brier (Rosa rubiginosa L.) (1966)
- Doctoral advisor: Reinhart Langer
- Height: 1.75 m (5 ft 9 in)
- Weight: 77 kg (170 lb)

Rugby union career
- Position: Halfback
Provincial / State sides
Years	Team	Apps	(Points)
1950–1951	Manawatu	5	
1955–1958	Canterbury	23	
International career
Years	Team	Apps	(Points)
1957	New Zealand	0	(0)

Brian Peter John Molloy ONZM CRSNZ (12 August 1930 – 31 July 2022) was a New Zealand plant ecologist, conservationist, and rugby union player.

== Early life, education and family ==
Born in Wellington on 12 August 1930, and orphaned at a young age, Molloy grew up in Waikanae and Palmerston North. He was educated at Marist Brothers' High School in Palmerston North, and then completed a Diploma in Agriculture at Massey Agricultural College in 1950. He went on to gain a Diploma in Teaching from Christchurch Teachers' College, and studied botany at Canterbury University College, where he graduated BSc in 1957, and MSc with first-class honours in 1960. The title of his master's thesis was A study in subalpine plant ecology on Fog Peak Ridge, Porters Pass, Canterbury. In 1966, Molloy completed a PhD on the autecology of sweet brier, Rosa rubiginosa, under the supervision of Reinhart Langer at Lincoln College, at that time a constituent college of the University of Canterbury.

In 1957, Molloy married Barbara Anita O'Neill, and the couple went on to have four children.

== Rugby union career ==
A halfback, Molloy made his debut for Manawatu at a provincial level while still a teenager, and later represented Canterbury when he was a university student in Christchurch. He was a member of the New Zealand national side, the All Blacks, on their 1957 tour of Australia, playing in five games and scoring one try. However, he did not appear in any of the test matches. From 1975 to 1978, Molloy served as a New Zealand Universities selector.

== Scientific career ==
After his master's studies, Molloy worked for the Department of Agriculture as a research officer, investigating tussock grasslands, pasture ecology and weeds. In 1969, he moved to the botany division of the Department of Scientific and Industrial Research (DSIR)—later known as Landcare Research—where he remained until his retirement in 1995. At DSIR / Landcare Research, he specialised in plant taxonomy, nature conservation, and the history of soil and vegetation. Subsequently, Molloy worked as a botanical and conservation consultant, and maintained his relationship with Landcare Research as a research associate.

Regarded as the leading authority on New Zealand orchids, Molloy authored or co-authored over 100 scientific papers, and several books. His canonical text, Native Orchids of New Zealand, written with J.H. Johns, was published in 1983.

=== Taxonomist ===
The standard author abbreviation Molloy is used to indicate this person as the author when citing a botanical name.

== Conservation activities ==
Between 1989 and 1998, Molloy was a director of the Queen Elizabeth II National Trust. He then served as the trust's high-country representative until 2012. He was also active in many other conservation groups, leading to the establishment of new, and extension of existing, protected areas and reserves. In particular, he is acknowledged as transforming Riccarton Bush after years of mismanagement.

== Later life and death ==
Molloy was widowed by the death of his wife, Barbara Molloy, in 2017. He died in Christchurch on 31 July 2022.

== Honours and awards ==
Molloy was awarded the Loder Cup in 1990, in recognition of his contributions to conservation and the study of New Zealand native plants. He received a community service award in 1992 and a civic award in 1995, both from the Christchurch City Council. Also in 1995, Molloy received the Charles Fleming Award for Environmental Achievement from the Royal Society of New Zealand.

In the 1997 Queen's Birthday Honours, Molloy was appointed an Officer of the New Zealand Order of Merit, for services to conservation.

For his contributions to the science, land and people of the high country, Molloy received the high country committee of Federated Farmers award in 2000; and in 2006 he was accorded a lifetime conservation achievement award by the New Zealand Plant Conservation Network. The following year, he was named as an associate of honour by the Royal New Zealand Institute of Horticulture, in recognition of his distinguished service to horticulture in New Zealand. In 2010, Molloy was awarded the Bledisloe Trophy by the Canterbury Botanical Society, for his contribution to New Zealand botany.

Molloy was elected as a Companion of the Royal Society of New Zealand in 2011, for the promotion and advancement of science and technology in New Zealand. Also in 2011, he received the Hatch Medal of the New Zealand Native Orchid Group, for his outstanding contribution to orchidology in New Zealand.

== Honorific eponyms ==
Two endemic plants have been named in Molloy's honour: the Cook Strait kōwhai, Sophora molloyi, in 2001; and the hidden spider orchid, Molloybas cryptanthus, in 2002.

In 2012, the Brian Molloy QEII National Trust Scholarship for doctoral research in New Zealand ecology was established.

== Selected publications ==
- Ferns in Peel Forest: a Field Guide, 1983, Christchurch, N.Z., ISBN 0477061117, Department of Lands and Survey
- Riccarton Bush, Putaringamotu : natural history and management, 1995, Christchurch, N.Z., ISBN 047302876X, Riccarton Bush Trust
