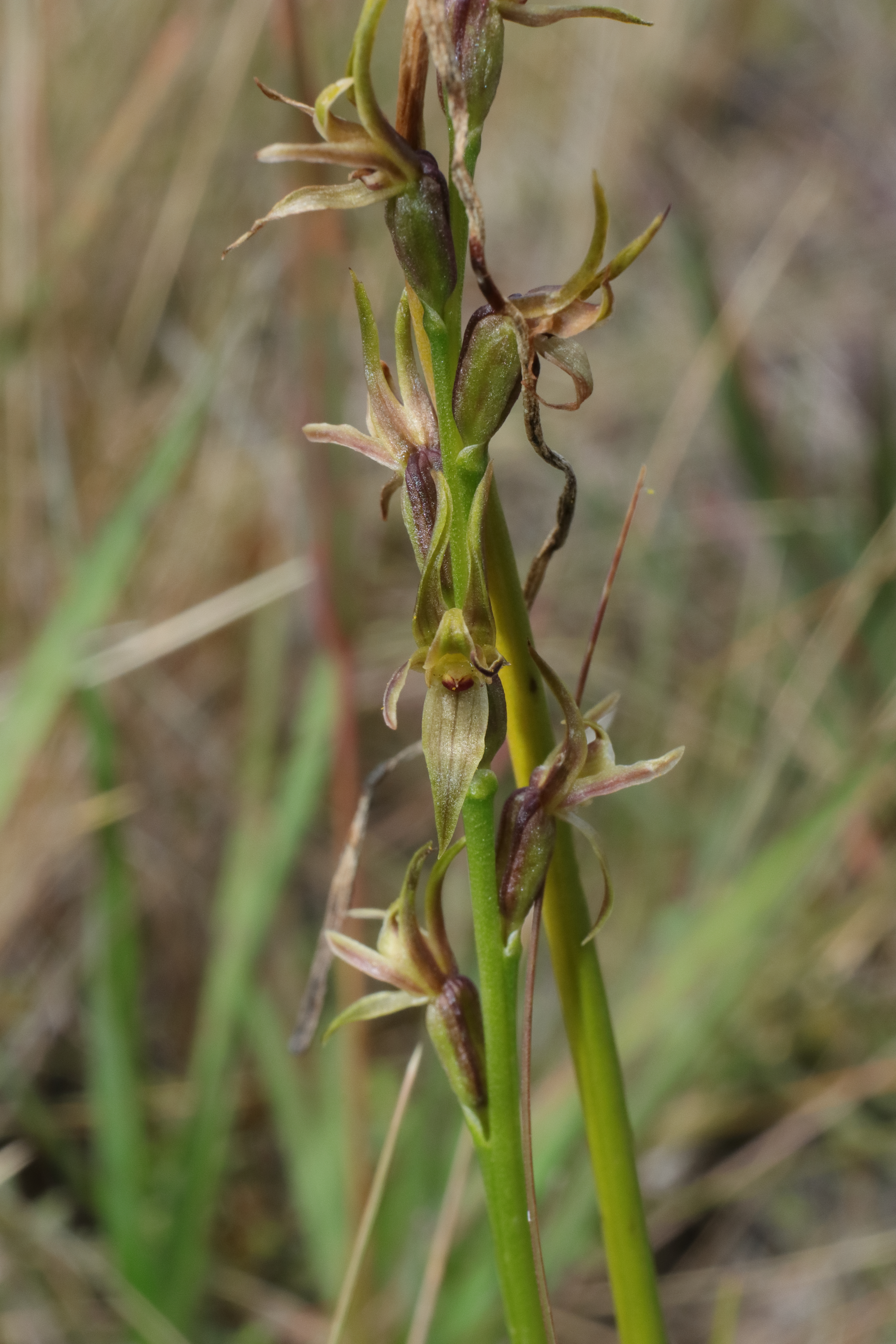
- In Erua

Scientific classification
- Kingdom: Plantae
- Clade: Tracheophytes
- Clade: Angiosperms
- Clade: Monocots
- Order: Asparagales
- Family: Orchidaceae
- Subfamily: Orchidoideae
- Tribe: Diurideae
- Genus: Prasophyllum
- Species: P. elegantissimum

Binomial name
- Prasophyllum elegantissimum Lehnebach 2025

= Prasophyllum elegantissimum =

Species of orchid

Prasophyllum elegantissimum, commonly known as the elegant leek orchid, is a species of orchid endemic to New Zealand. In Māori it is called manawa wairepo. It is currently listed as Threatened - Nationally Vulnerable.

== Description ==
Prasophyllum elegantissimum is a terrestrial, perennial, tuberous, herb. It is similar to Prasophyllum colensoi however the dorsal sepal has an apiculate tip.

== Taxonomy ==
It was first described in 2025 by Carlos Lehnebach.

== Distribution and habitat ==
Prasophyllum elegantissimum is endemic to New Zealand, and is found on the North Island, South Island, Stewart Island / Rakiura, and Auckland Island. It grows in habitats ranging from lowland to sub-alpine, and flowers from December to February.
