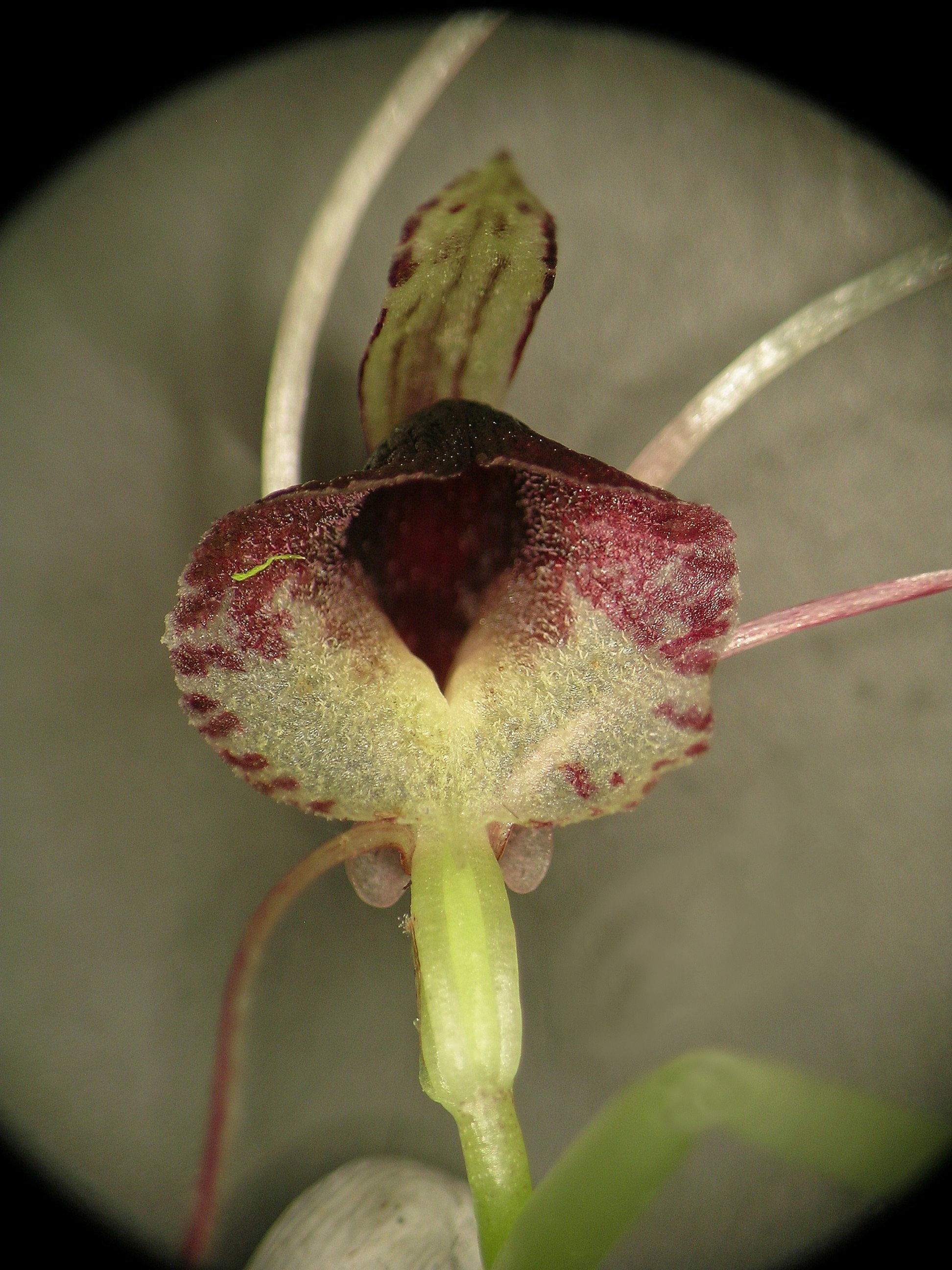
- Corybas papillosus collected from Fiordland National Park

Scientific classification
- Kingdom: Plantae
- Clade: Tracheophytes
- Clade: Angiosperms
- Clade: Monocots
- Order: Asparagales
- Family: Orchidaceae
- Subfamily: Orchidoideae
- Tribe: Diurideae
- Genus: Corybas
- Species: C. papillosus

Binomial name
- Corybas papillosus (Colenso) Lehnebach

Synonyms
- Corysanthes papillosa Colenso; Nematoceras papillosum (Colenso) Molloy, D.L.Jones & M.A.Clem.

= Corybas papillosus =

Species of orchid

Corybas papillosus is a species of terrestrial orchid endemic to the New Zealand. It has a solitary rounded leaf with a heart-shaped base and a single flower with a long, slender green dorsal sepal, as well as a crimson and white labellum.

== Description ==
Corybas papillosus is a terrestrial, perennial herb with a solitary thin leaf, rounded with a sometimes heart-shaped base, born on a petiole. The petiole is white or pale pink. The leaf is light green with a very slightly grooved midrib sometimes marked with purple. The upper surface is papillate (covered in small rounded projections). The single flower is held on a short petiole and is accompanied by two slender floral bracts of unequal size; the smaller one faces the flower and is very reduced, while the larger one faces away. The dorsal sepal extends well past the labellum. It is very slender and ends in a sharp tip that is curved upwards. The dorsal sepal is pale green flecked with maroon. The lateral sepals are long and filiform (thread-like); they are pale pink or maroon near the base and fade to white towards the tips. The petals are similar but much longer. The petals are said to be more blunt-ended, compared to the lateral sepals, which end in sharp tips. The labellum forms a funnel-like structure that abruptly expands into flared circular main portion known as the lamina. Its very upper border is deep crimson and slightly undulated, while the rest is translucent white or pale pink. The lower border is spotted or flecked with red. Flowering occurs from October to December. The peduncles elongate greatly as the capsule ripens.

C. papillosus closely resembles C. macranthus, and the two have been shown through genetic analyses to be sister species. Because C. macranthus is quite variable, it can be difficult to differentiate the two. Most often, C. macranthus has a dark crimson or nearly black lamina, occasionally with a pale green throat, while C. papillosus is dark red in its upper portion and white or pale pink its main lower portion. William Colenso, who described C. papillosus, mentioned the papillate leaf as another key factor, but because C. macranthus is so variable, it is not clear whether this trait can be consistently used. C. macranthus may also have a wider range than C. papillosus.

== Taxonomy ==
Corybas papillosus was first described by William Colenso in 1884 under the name Corysanthes papillosa. The specific epithet (papillosa) is a Latin word that refers to the papillate leaves.

In 2002, Brian Molloy, David Jones, and Mark Clements transferred the species into the genus Nematoceras under the name Nematoceras papillosum. However, in a 2014 dissertation that analyzed DNA markers from Corybas species occurring from the Himalayas to New Zealand, Stephanie Lyon indicated that Nematoceras and other genera that Molloy, Jones, and Clements had segregated ought to be returned to Corybas. The World Checklist of Selected Plant Families and the New Zealand Department of Conservation recognized these changes, but Nematoceras papillosum and two other Nematoceras species remained unplaced because they had no combination under Corybas and thus had not been transferred.

Finally, in 2016, Carlos Lehnebach transferred the species to Corybas under its current name, Corybas papillosus. Lehnebach also examined the systematics of the Nematoceras clade using Bayesian analyses and found C. papillosus to be sister to C. macranthus, which it closely resembles. Lehnebach's results also indicated that C. papillosus and C. macranthus are more closely related to the C. trilobus aggregate than they are to C. rivularis.

== Distribution and habitat ==
Corybas papillosus is endemic to New Zealand's North Island and South Island. In the North Island, it is known from the Hawke's Bay region. It occurs in montane habitats up to 1000 meters above sea level in moist, shady sites under tall forest or rock overhangs. It tends to grow in calcium-rich substrates, such as mudstone or siltstone (known as papa rock), as well as limestone.

== Gallery ==
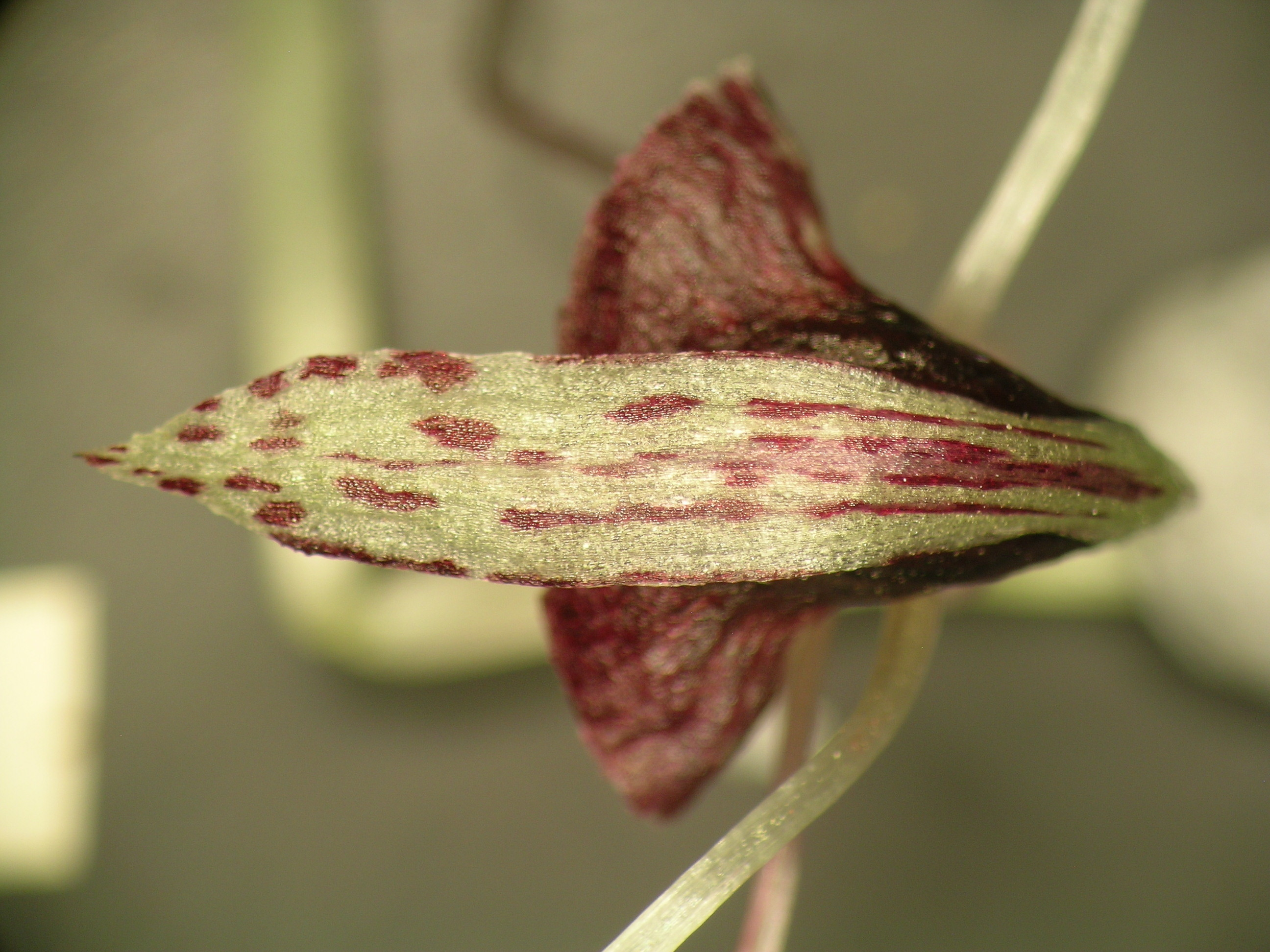
Corybas papillosus dorsal view, showing the slender, acuminate dorsal sepal extending well past the labellum.

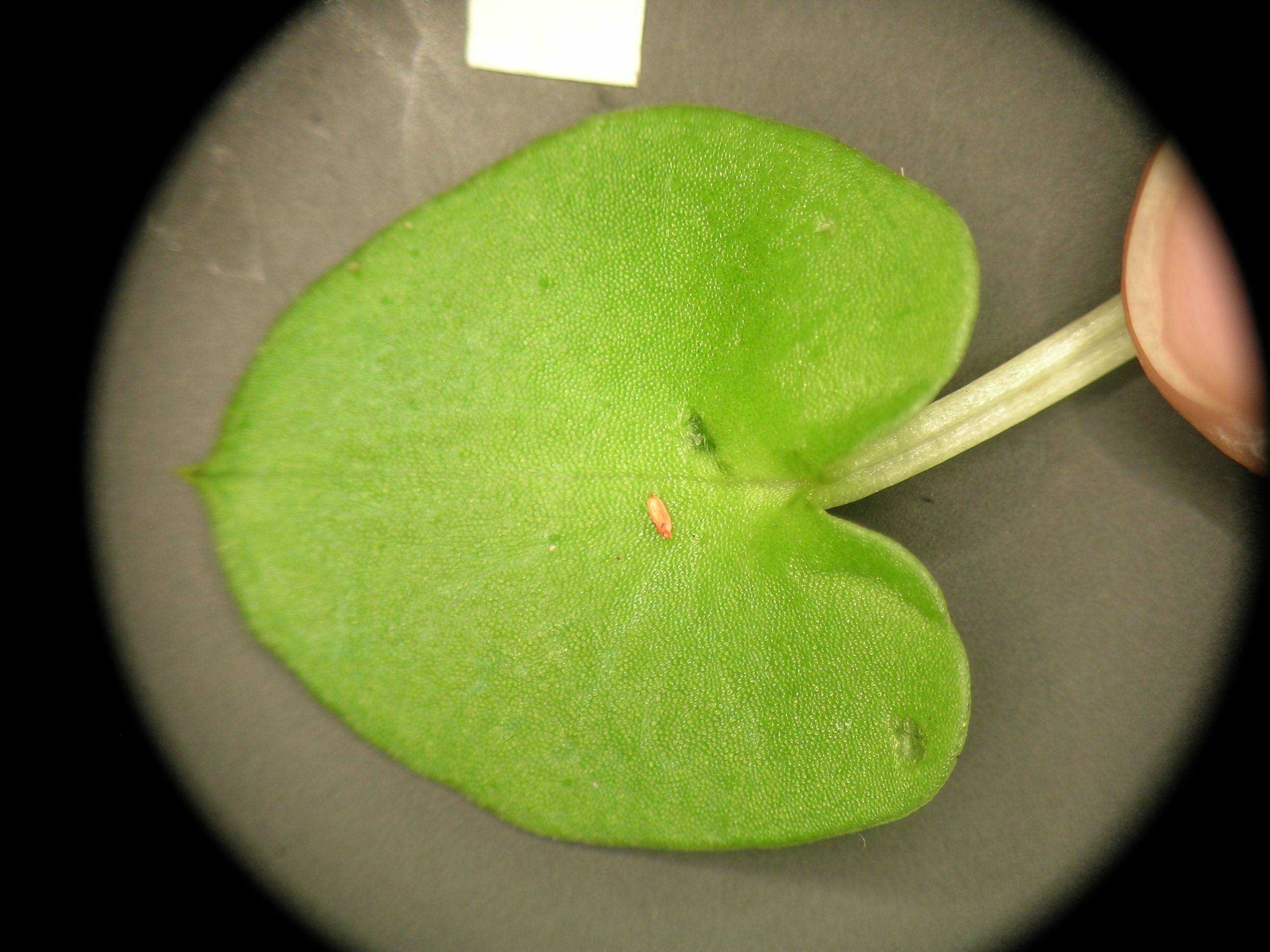
Corybas papillosus leaf.
