= Swamp leek orchid =

Swamp leek orchid is a common name for several plants and may refer to:

- Prasophyllum drummondii, endemic to Western Australia
- Prasophyllum frenchii, endemic to south-eastern Australia
- Prasophyllum hectorii, endemic to New Zealand
- Prasophyllum hygrophilum, endemic to Victoria, Australia
