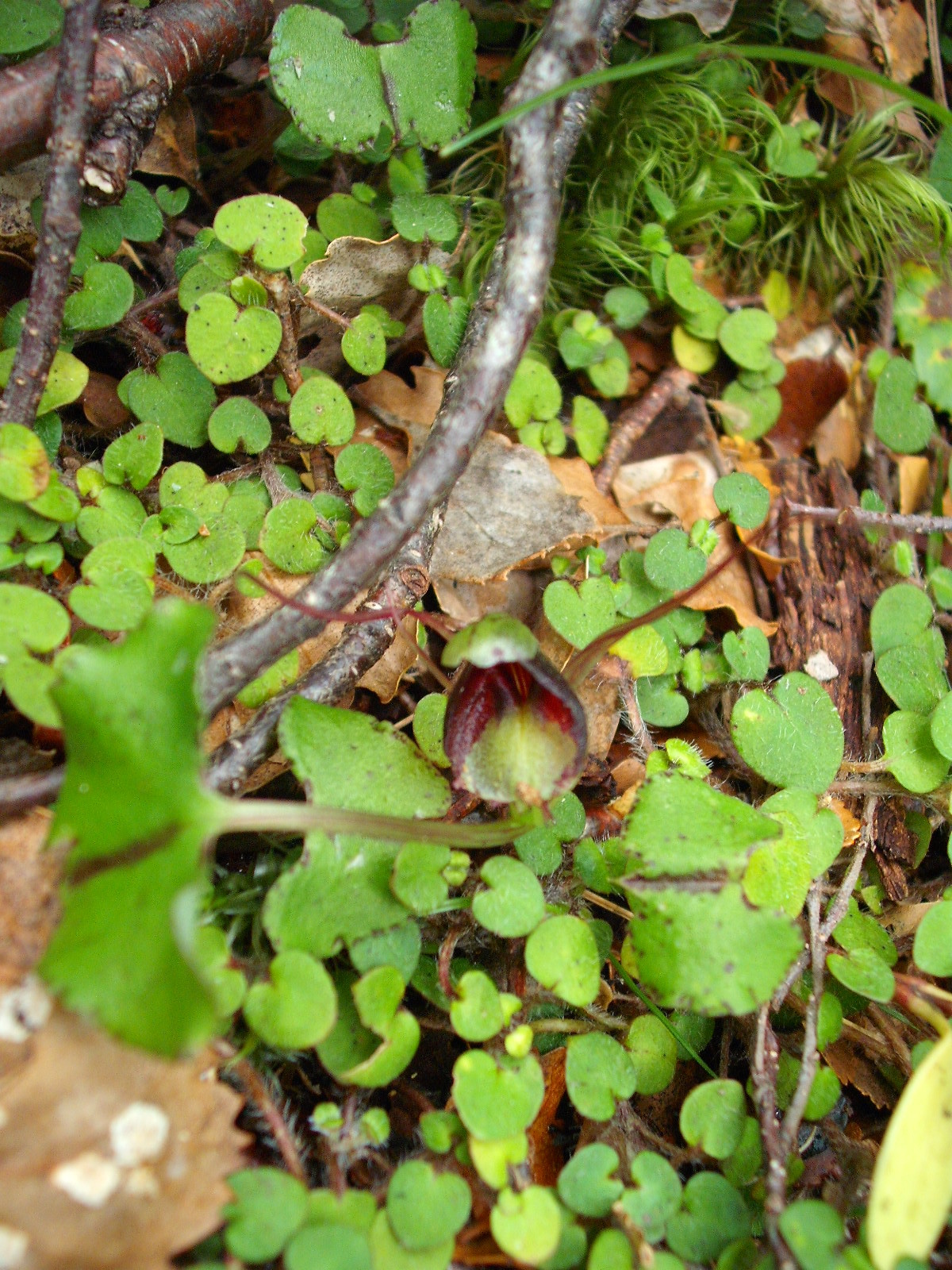
- Corybas hypogaeus in Nelson Lakes National Park

Conservation status
- Naturally Uncommon (NZ TCS)

Scientific classification
- Kingdom: Plantae
- Clade: Tracheophytes
- Clade: Angiosperms
- Clade: Monocots
- Order: Asparagales
- Family: Orchidaceae
- Subfamily: Orchidoideae
- Tribe: Diurideae
- Genus: Corybas
- Species: C. hypogaeus

Binomial name
- Corybas hypogaeus (Colenso) Lehnebach

Synonyms
- Corysanthes hypogaea Colenso; Nematoceras hypogaeum (Colenso) Molloy, D.L.Jones & M.A.Clem.

= Corybas hypogaeus =

Species of orchid

Corybas hypogaeus is a species of terrestrial orchid endemic to the New Zealand. It is part of the C. trilobus aggregate, whose members are characterized by a funnel or dish-shaped labellum and an often heart or kidney-shaped solitary leaf.

== Description ==
Corybas hypogaeus is a terrestrial, perennial herb with a solitary reniform (kidney-shaped) to cordiform (heart-shaped) leaf born on a petiole 10–15 mm long. The petiole is white or pale pink with a sheathing bract at the base. The leaf is sometimes flecked with maroon; it is light green on the upper surface and silvery or silvery purple on the lower surface. It is trilobed at its tip, with its middle lobe ending in a sharp tip; the auricles at the base of the leaf are pronounced. The single flower is held on a short peduncle that is white to pale pink; it is accompanied by two floral bracts of unequal length, with the smaller bract pointing towards the leaf and the longer bract pointing away. The dorsal sepal is narrow at the base and broad towards the rounded tip; it is light green often with purple flecks running down the middle. It arches over the flower and is equal to the labellum in length or slightly longer. The lateral sepals are long and filiform (thread-like) and are white to pink. The petals are similar but shorter. The labellum is short and auriculate at the base. Its main portion is strongly cupped, and its tip is markedly laciniate (deeply jagged). It is green to nearly white, and its borders are maroon. Flowering occurs from August to September. The peduncle elongates greatly as the capsule ripens.

Corybas hypogaeus can be distinguished from other members of the C. trilobus aggregate by its the diminutive flower, which is commonly buried in leaf litter, and its characteristically jagged, cupped labellum. It is highly similar to the recently described species C. sanctigeorgianus, from which it can be distinguished by its labellum with a green-tinted center, rather than creamy white, and its dorsal sepal equal to the length to the labellum or slightly longer (rather than noticeably longer). Moreover, C. sanctigeorgianus is only known from select sites on the North Island.

== Taxonomy ==
Corybas hypogaeus was first described by William Colenso in 1884 under the name Corysanthes hypogaea. The specific epithet (hypogaea) is formed from the Greek prefix hypo-, meaning "below", and the word gaea, meaning "Earth", referring to the flowers that are often found buried in leaf litter. In 2002, Brian Molloy, David Jones, and Mark Clements transferred the species into the genus Nematoceras under the name Nematoceras hypogaeum. However, in a 2014 dissertation that analyzed DNA markers from Corybas species occurring from the Himalayas to New Zealand, Stephanie Lyon indicated that Nematoceras and other genera that Molloy, Jones, and Clements had segregated ought to be returned to Corybas. The World Checklist of Selected Plant Families and the New Zealand Department of Conservation recognized these changes, but Nematoceras hypogaeum and two other Nematoceras species remained unplaced because they had no combination under Corybas and thus had not been transferred. Finally, in 2016, Carlos Lehnebach transferred the species to Corybas under its current name, Corybas hypogaeus.

== Distribution and habitat ==
Corybas hypogaeus is endemic to New Zealand's North Island and South Island. In the North Island, it is known from the Hunua Ranges, Waikato, and Wairarapa. In the South Island it is known only from north-west Nelson. It grows in lowland to montane habitats in kānuka or southern beech-dominated forest and is usually found near the trunks of these trees or on the borders of swamps within the forest, half-buried in deep drifts of decaying leaves. The leaf of the plant is usually all that is exposed.

== Gallery ==
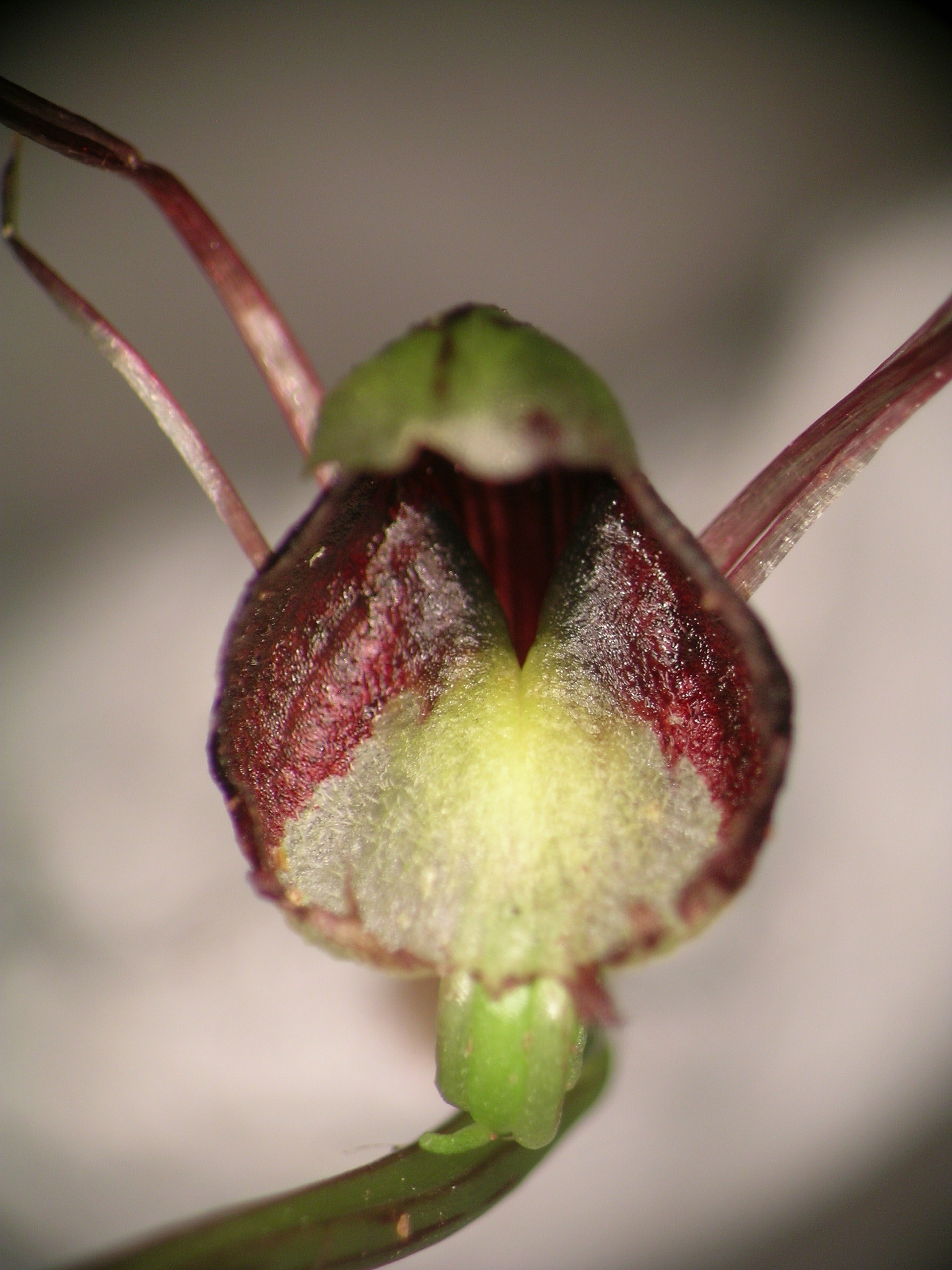
Corybas hypogaeus flower detail

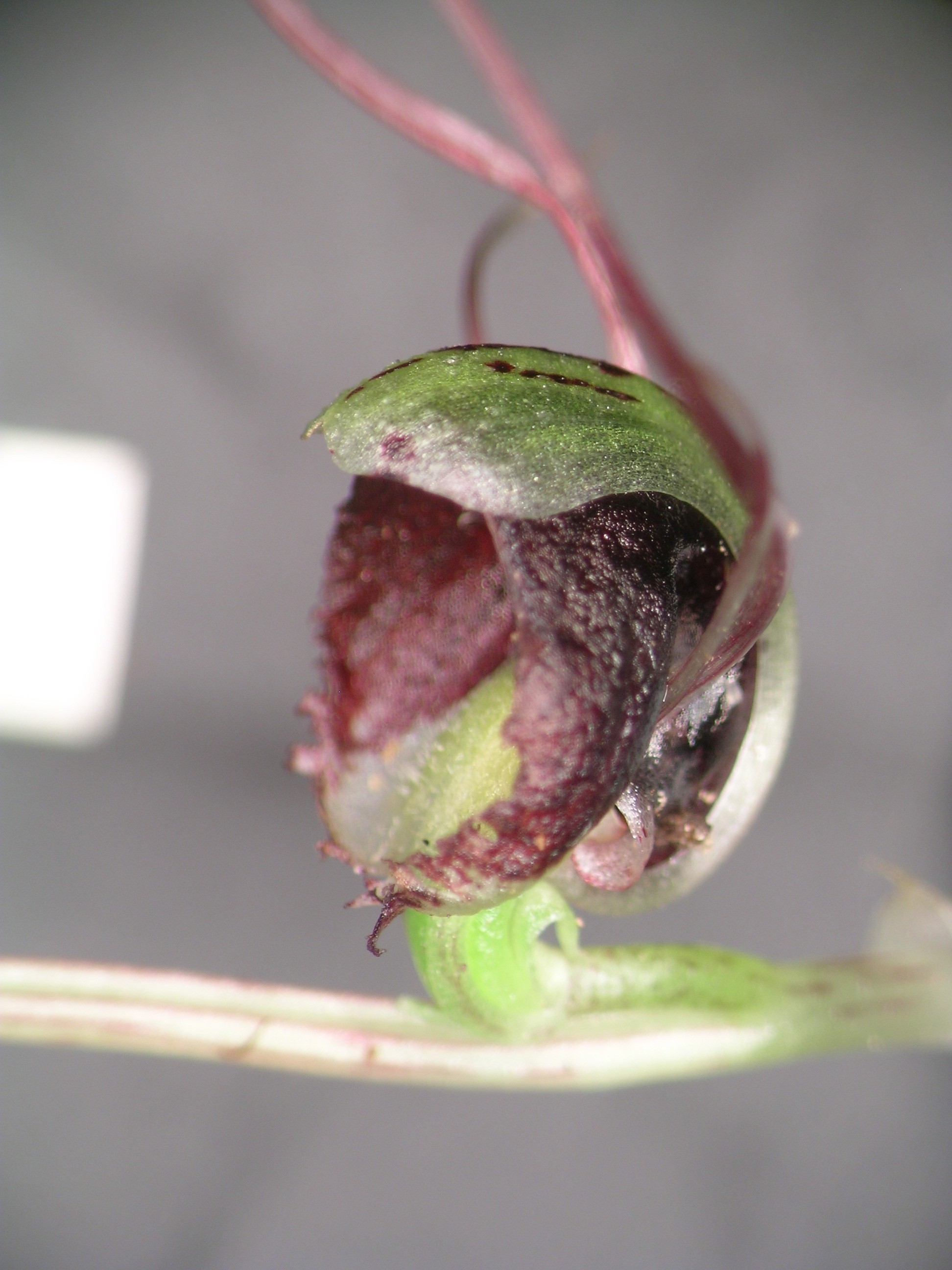
Corybas hypogaeus flower side view

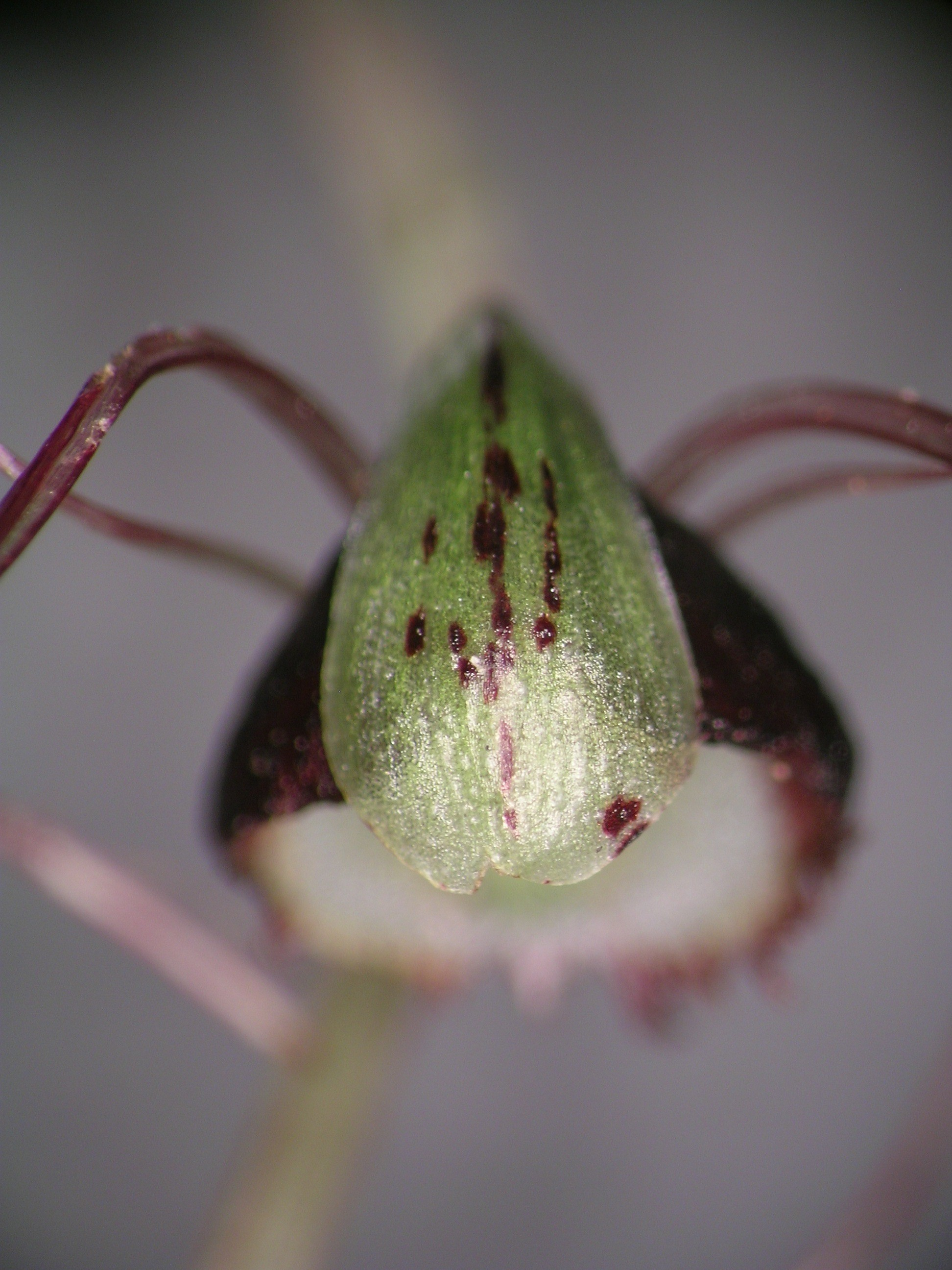
Corybas hypogaeus flower upper view

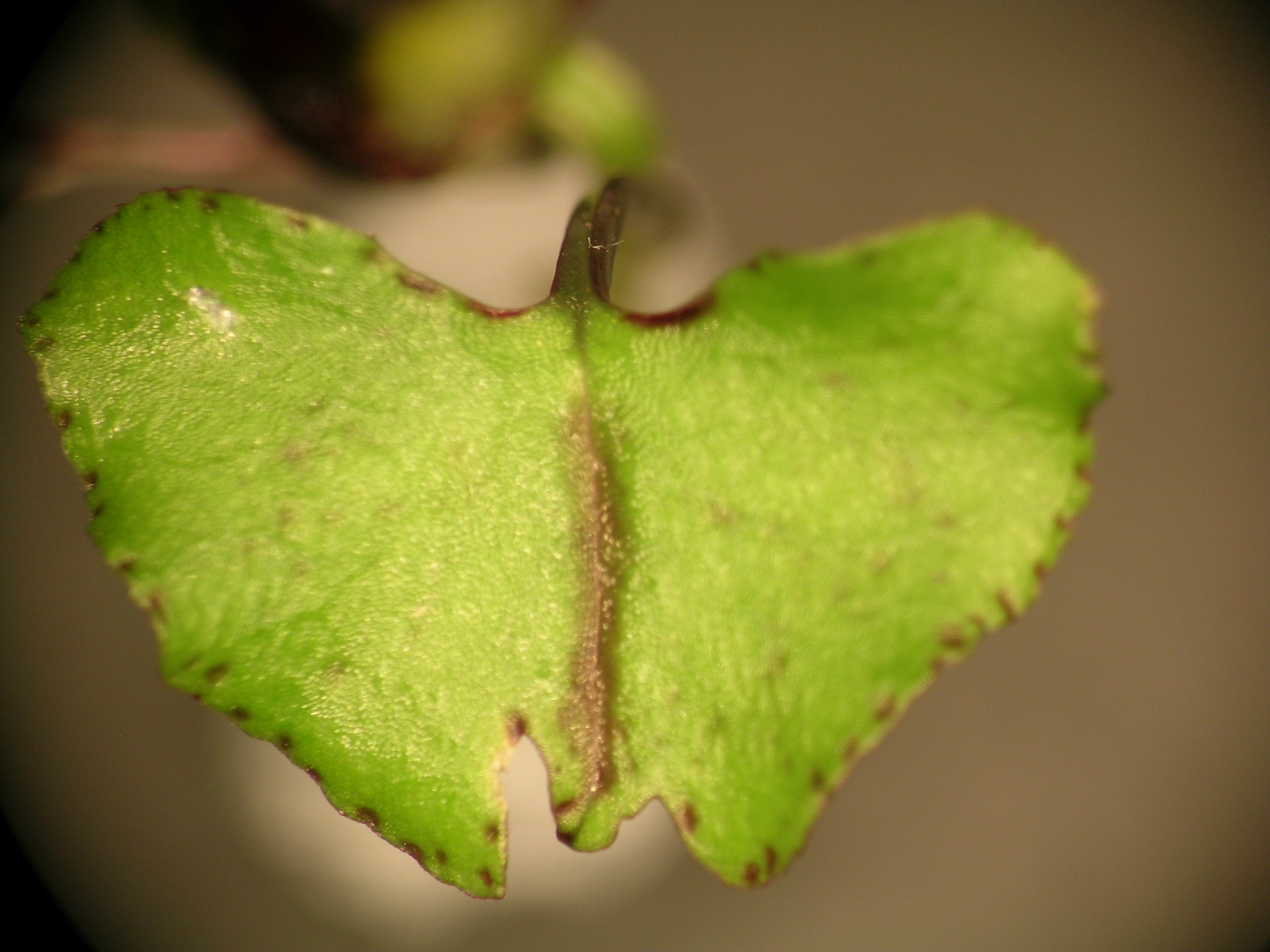
Corybas hypogaeus leaf
