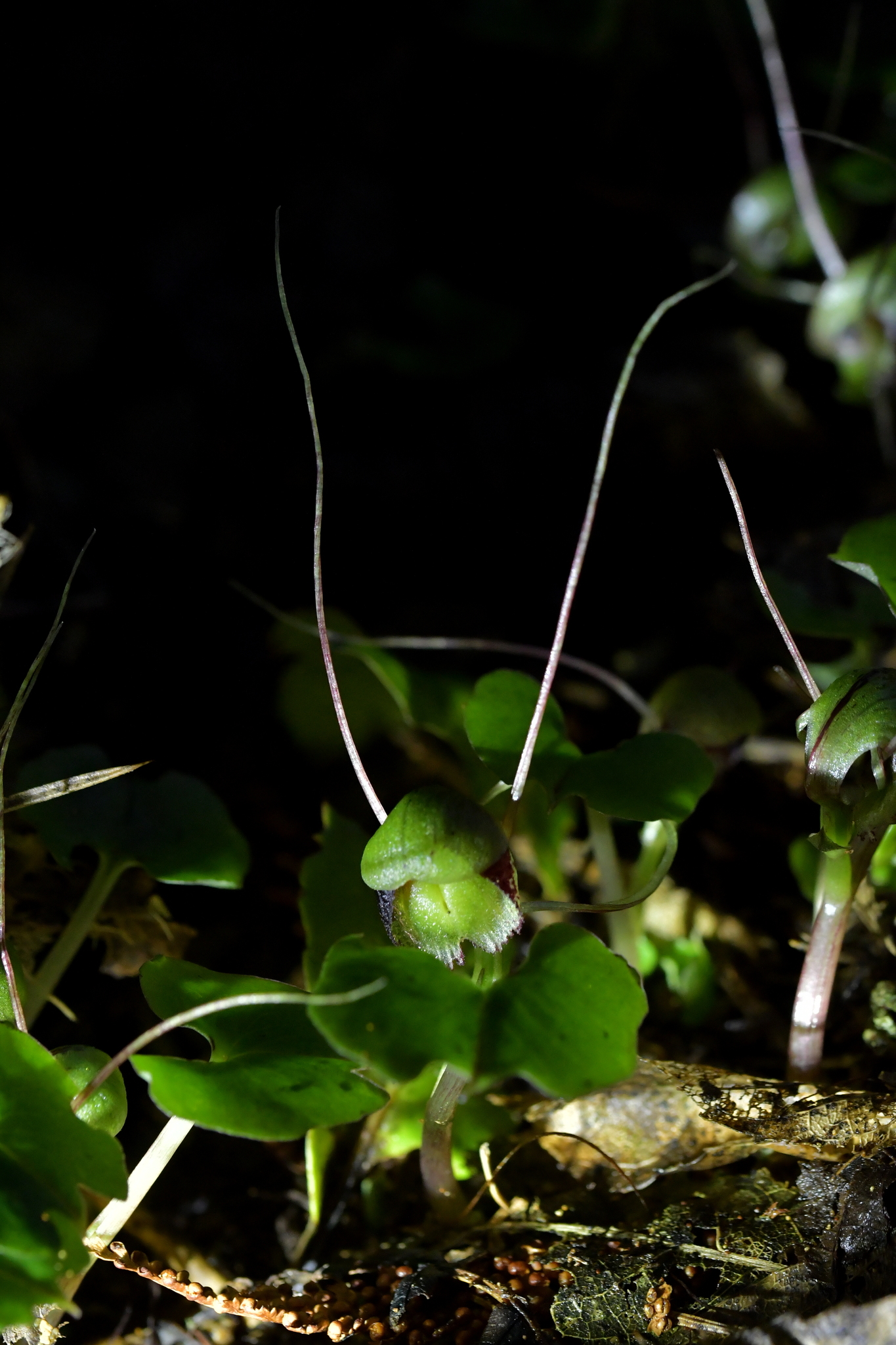
- Corybas trilobus s.s.

Scientific classification
- Kingdom: Plantae
- Clade: Tracheophytes
- Clade: Angiosperms
- Clade: Monocots
- Order: Asparagales
- Family: Orchidaceae
- Subfamily: Orchidoideae
- Tribe: Diurideae
- Genus: Corybas
- Species: C. trilobus

Binomial name
- Corybas trilobus (Hook.f.) Rchb.f.

Synonyms
- Nematoceras trilobum Hook.f.; Corysanthes triloba (Hook.f.) Hook.f.

= Corybas trilobus =

Species of orchid

Corybas trilobus is a species of terrestrial orchid endemic to New Zealand. It is part of the C. trilobus aggregate, whose members are characterized by a funnel or dish-shaped labellum and an often heart or kidney-shaped solitary leaf.

== Description ==
Corybas trilobus is a variable terrestrial, perennial herb whose boundaries continue to be further delineated. The following description adheres to its 2016 delineation sensu stricto. C. trilobus has a single reniform (kidney-shaped) leaf born on a petiole that is 13–24 mm long. The leaf itself is at least 18 mm in diameter and is longer than it is wide; its apex is broad but ends with a sudden sharp point, and its base is distinctly two-lobed. The single flower is held on a peduncle with a small, slender floral bract; the ovary is pale yellow-green and ribbed. The flower is characteristically mostly pale-colored except for its labellum margins. The dorsal sepal arches over the labellum and is broadly rounded at the apex; it is green and does not extend past the labellum. It presses firmly against the apex of the labellum and does not fold backwards. The lateral sepals are long and filiform (thread-like), often crimson at the base and fading to crystalline pink or white near the tips. The petals are similar though noticeably shorter; they still exceed 43 mm. The labellum is translucent green, but its borders tend to be streaked or splotched with crimson-maroon. It is strongly downturned and rounded. Flowering occurs from September to November. The peduncle elongates greatly as the capsule ripens.

Corybas trilobus can be confused with several other species, some in the C. trilobus species complex and some not. Its distinguishing features include its dorsal sepal, which must not extend past the labellum or be reflexed, its strongly reniform leaves, which are wider than they are long, its mostly pale, elliptic flowers but with slightly pigmented labella, and its long petiole and petals.

== Taxonomy ==
Corybas trilobus was first described by Joseph Hooker in 1853 as Nematoceras trilobum. Its name was subsequently changed by Hooker in 1864 to Corysanthes triloba. In 1871, Heinrich Gustav Reichenbach changed its name to Corybas trilobus. Since then, multiple similar species have been described and placed within the C. trilobus aggregate. In 2016, Carlos Lehnebach split off 5 new species from C. trilobus: C. confusus, C. obscurus, C. sanctigeorgianus, C. vitreus, and C. walliae. Furthermore, using Bayesian analyses and maximum parsimony analyses, Lehnebach found that not all of the newly described species may fall within a single clade.

== Distribution and habitat ==
Corybas trilobus, like its close relatives, primarily inhabits the understories of southern beech forests consisting of Nothofagus.
