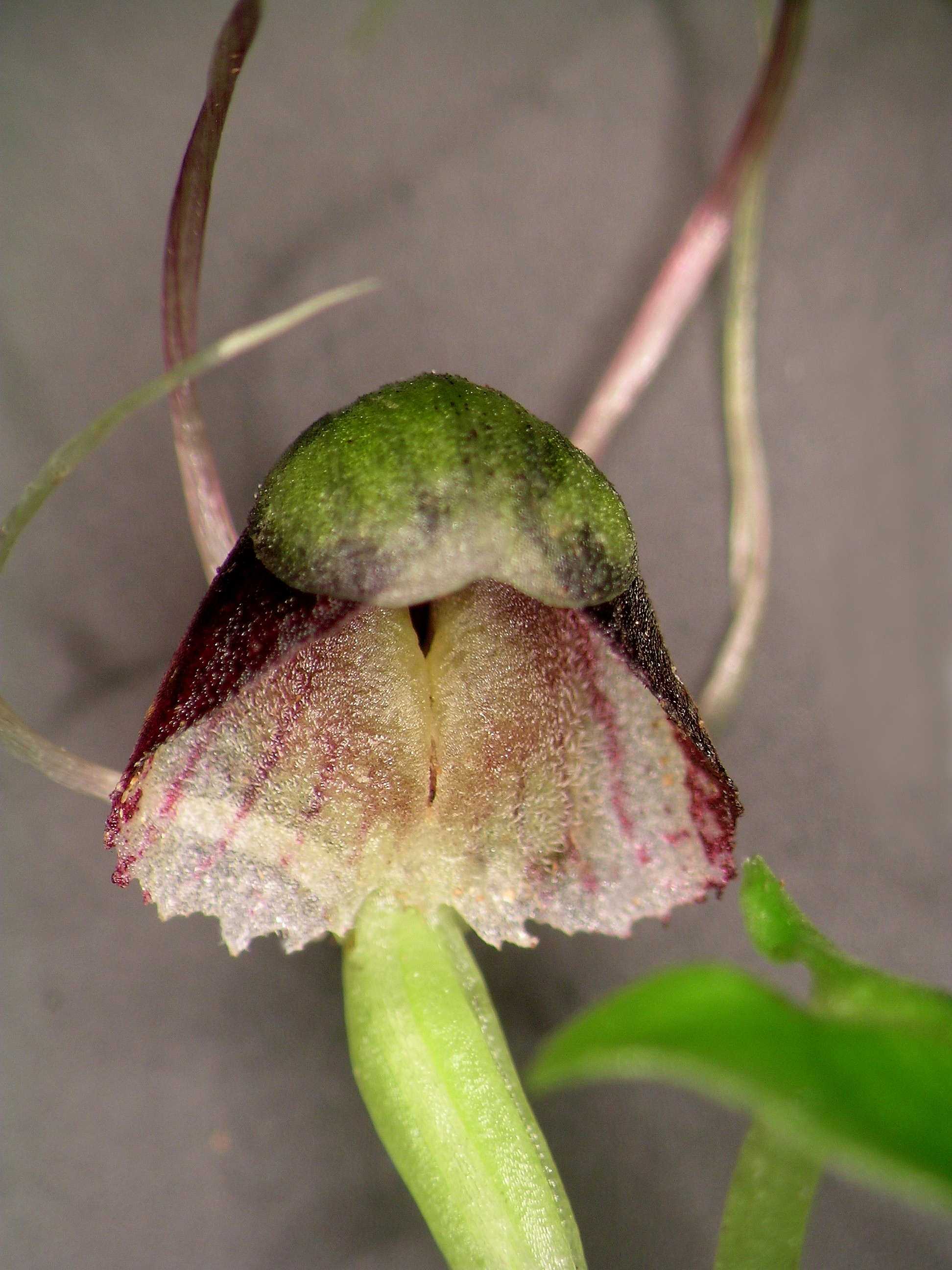
- MA I378109 TePapa

Scientific classification
- Kingdom: Plantae
- Clade: Tracheophytes
- Clade: Angiosperms
- Clade: Monocots
- Order: Asparagales
- Family: Orchidaceae
- Subfamily: Orchidoideae
- Tribe: Diurideae
- Subtribe: Acianthinae
- Genus: Corybas
- Species: C. vitreus

Binomial name
- Corybas vitreus Lehnebach

= Corybas vitreus =

Species of plant

Corybas vitreus is a species of orchid endemic to New Zealand, and first described in 2016 by Carlos Adolfo Lehnebach.

== Description ==
C. vitreus is a terrestrial, seasonal orchid, with solitary heart-shaped leaves having entire margins. The flowers, too, are solitary and their central part is mostly translucent. It has a height of 14 to 30 mm when flowering. It is very like C. walliae but differs in having a translucent labellum lamina with a dark maroon to purple band along the lateral margin. It differs from C. trilobus by having a broadly ovate flower. It flowers September to October and fruits from November to early January.

== Distribution and habitat ==
It is endemic to New Zealand and found on both the North (in the south) and South Islands at altitudes of from 600 to 1300 m, in beech and Kunzea forests growing in the leaf litter.

== Conservation status ==
It is deemed to be "Not Threatened".
