= Swamp onion =

Swamp onion is a common name for multiple plants and may refer to:

- Allium madidum, native to Idaho, Oregon and Washington
- Allium validum, native to western North America

== See also ==
- Swamp leek orchid
