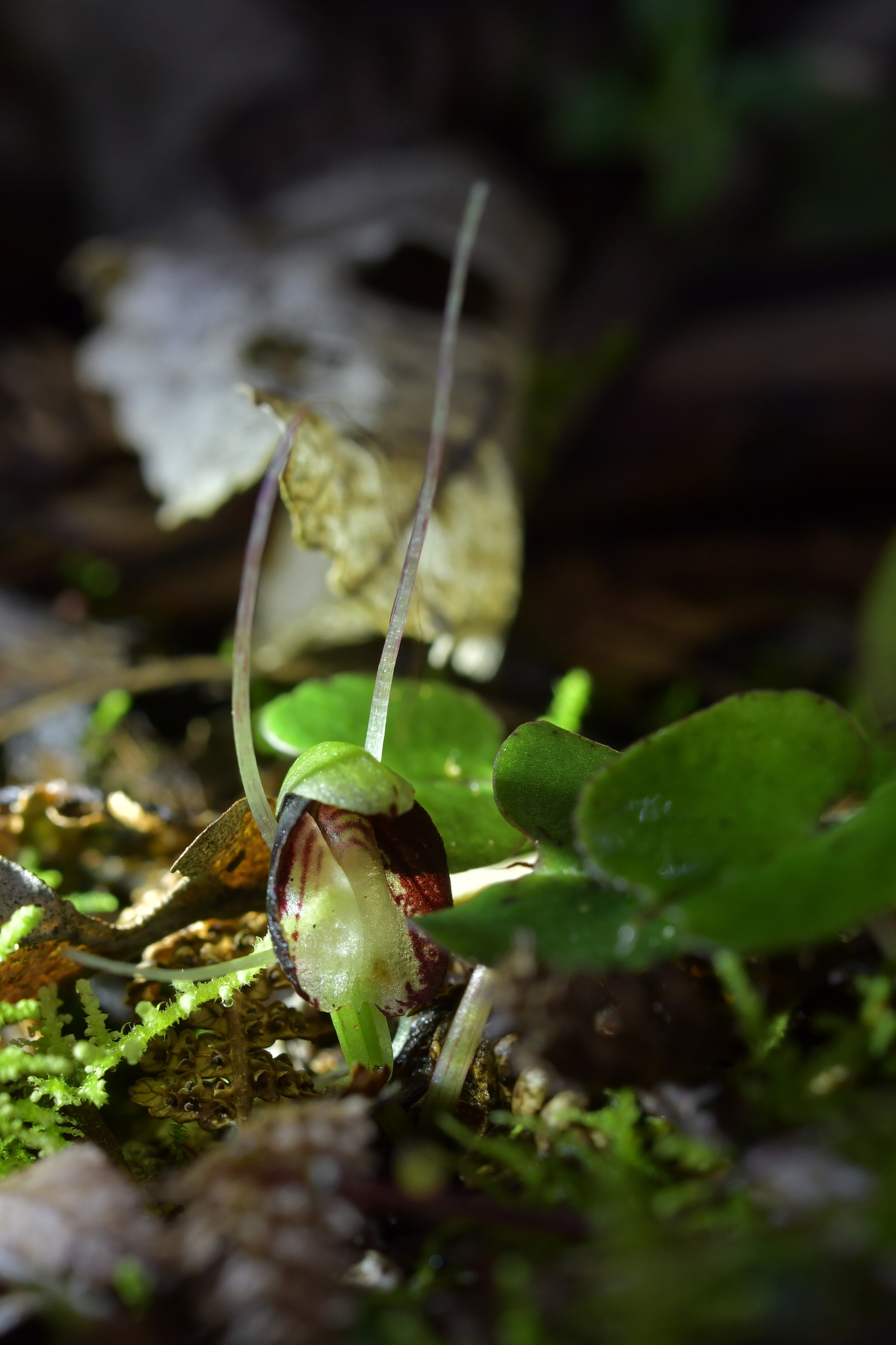

Scientific classification
- Kingdom: Plantae
- Clade: Tracheophytes
- Clade: Angiosperms
- Clade: Monocots
- Order: Asparagales
- Family: Orchidaceae
- Subfamily: Orchidoideae
- Tribe: Diurideae
- Genus: Corybas
- Species: C. sanctigeorgianus

Binomial name
- Corybas sanctigeorgianus Lehnebach

= Corybas sanctigeorgianus =

Species of orchid

Corybas sanctigeorgianus is a species of terrestrial orchid endemic to the North Island of New Zealand. It is part of the C. trilobus aggregate, whose members are characterized by a funnel or dish-shaped labellum and an often heart or kidney-shaped solitary leaf.

== Description ==
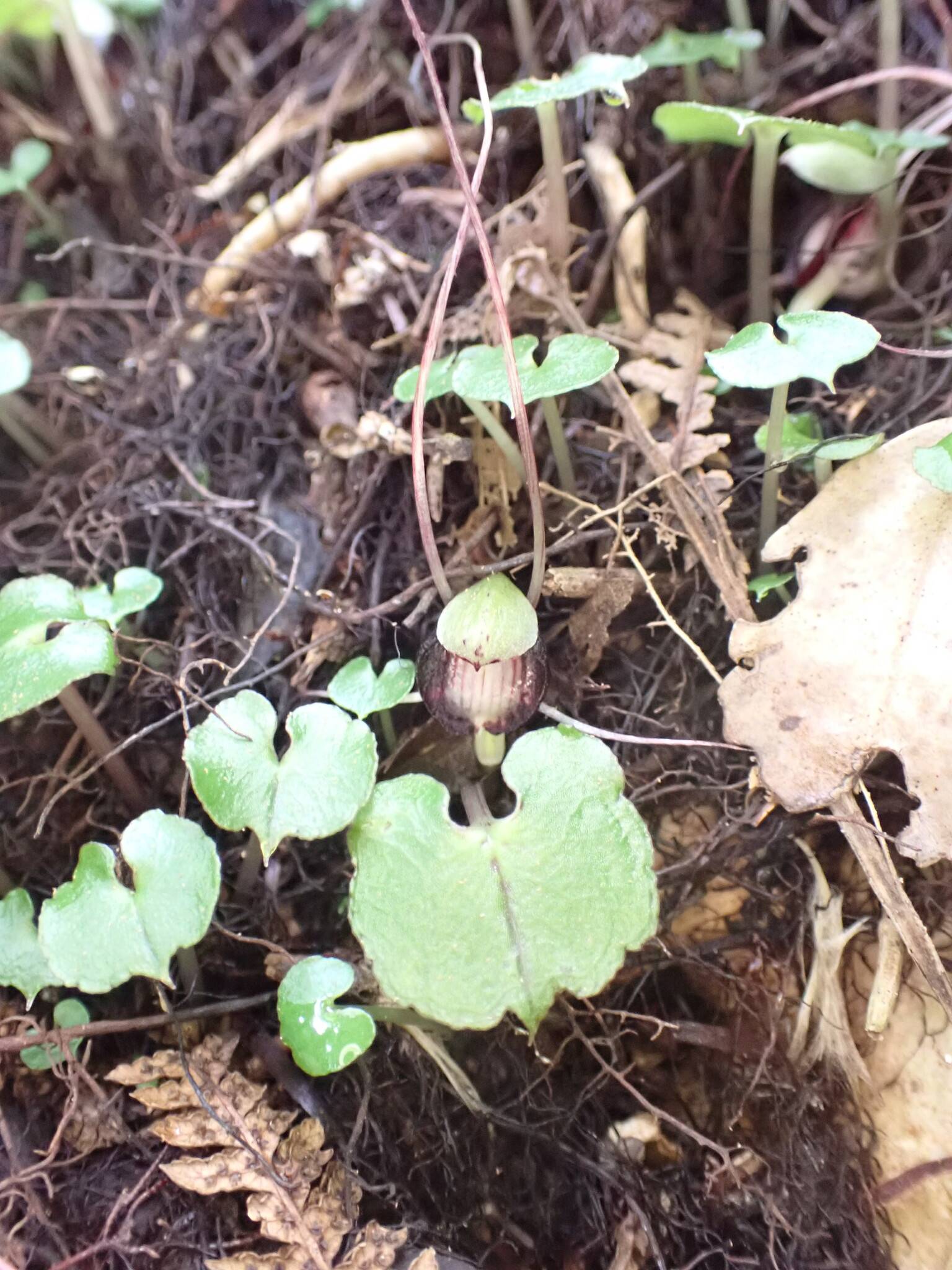
Corybas sanctigeorgianus with leaf.

Corybas sanctigeorgianus is a terrestrial, perennial herb with a solitary reniform (kidney-shaped) to cordiform (heart-shaped) leaf born on a petiole that is 9.8–12.7 mm long. The leaf itself is 10.0–13.2 mm × 14.0–19.0 mm; its apex ends in a sharp point. The single flower is held on a small peduncle with a short floral bract that is oval-shaped when flattened. The dorsal sepal is green, sometimes splotched with maroon, and arches over the labellum and is broadly rounded at the apex, although sometimes it is mucronate. The dorsal sepal is characteristically longer than the labellum. The lateral sepals are long and filiform (thread-like); they are crystalline white with crimson specks. The petals are similar but slightly longer. The labellum is predominantly white with dark red; it may be vertically streaked with red. It is covered in short trichomes and is auriculate (forming two lobes) at the base. The notch between the two lobes is 1.7–2.0 mm wide. The lip is strongly downturned; it folds inwards and forms a central groove, and its sides are slightly cupped. The margins are mostly entire, except for the tip, which is toothed. The column is straight with square wings on both sides of the stigma. Flowering occurs from mid-August to September.

The dorsal sepal length is a useful identifying characteristic. C. sanctigeorgianus resembles C. hypogaeus in flower and leaf shape and may be distinguished by its dorsal sepal that extends beyond its labellum; it also differs in its straight ovary and predominantly white labellum (excluding the margins). From C. trilobus, it may also be distinguished by its dorsal sepal length, as well as the white, rather than translucent green, labellum.

== Taxonomy ==
Corybas sanctigeorgianus was first described by Carlos Adolfo Lehnebach in 2016, having been split off from C. trilobus. Using Bayesian and maximum parsimony analyses, Lehnebach inferred that C. sanctigeorgianus was indeed part of the C. trilobus aggregate. The specific epithet (sanctigeorgianus) refers to Ian Saint George, who has authored multiple guides to New Zealand-native orchids and is co-editor of the New Zealand Native Orchid Journal.

== Distribution and habitat ==
Corybas sanctigeorgianus is endemic to the Hunua Ranges of New Zealand's North Island and grows in leaf litter under scrub or podocarp-broadleaved forest, gravelly soil, or the decaying trunks of tree ferns.

== Conservation ==
Corybas sanctigeorgianus was proposed to be listed as Nationally Critical under the New Zealand Threat Classification System. At the time of publication, it was known only from its type locality, the Hunua Ranges, where a population of about one hundred individuals occurs; a second population was noted to exist in the 1960s but had been lost. Subsequently, a new population, also in the Hunua Ranges, was found, and the species has yet to be ratified by the Threat Listing panel. Threats to C. sanctigeorgiaus include deforestation.
