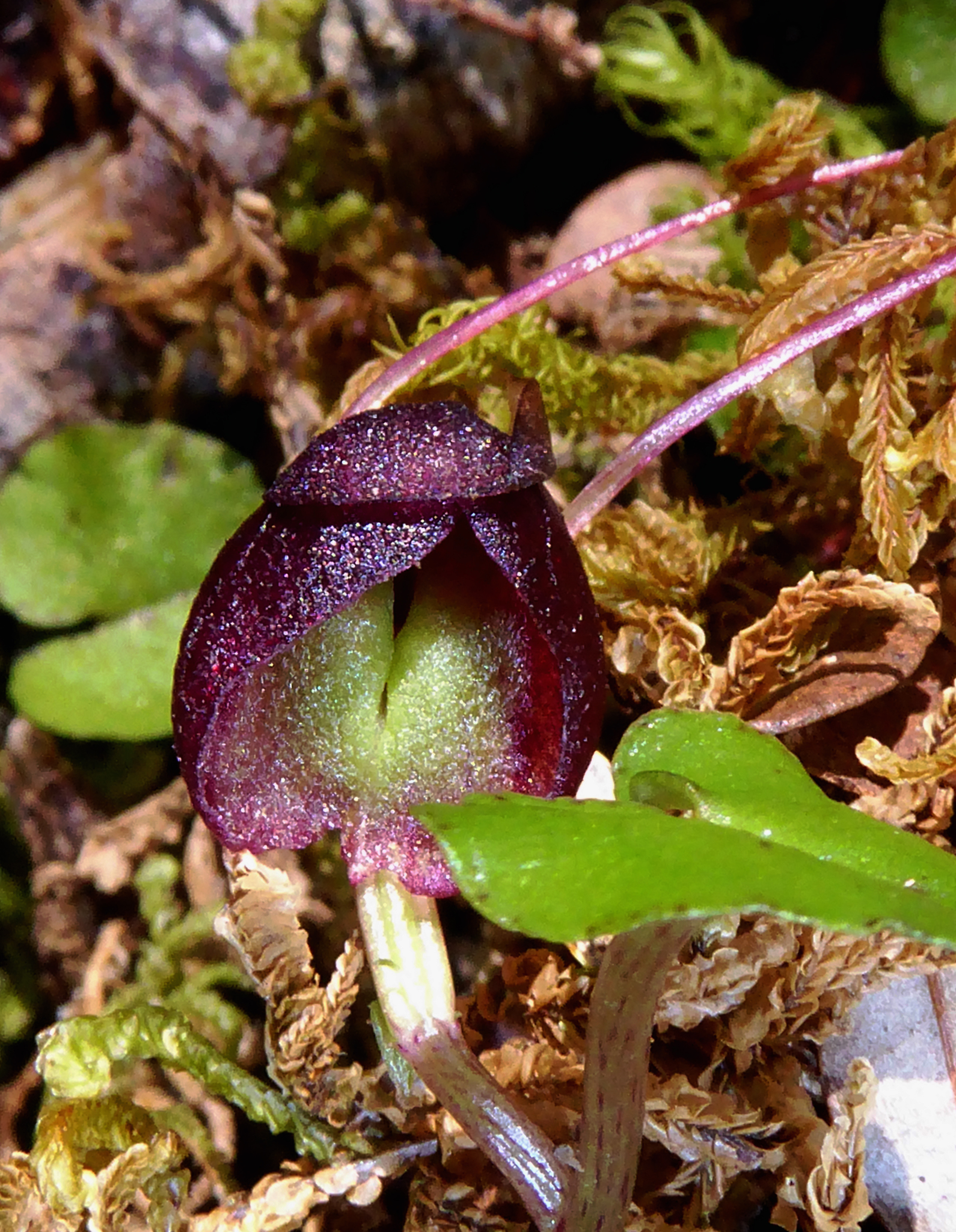

Conservation status
- Naturally Uncommon (NZ TCS)

Scientific classification
- Kingdom: Plantae
- Clade: Tracheophytes
- Clade: Angiosperms
- Clade: Monocots
- Order: Asparagales
- Family: Orchidaceae
- Subfamily: Orchidoideae
- Tribe: Diurideae
- Genus: Corybas
- Species: C. obscurus

Binomial name
- Corybas obscurus Lehnebach

= Corybas obscurus =

Species of orchid

Corybas obscurus is a species of terrestrial orchid endemic to New Zealand. It has a solitary heart-shaped leaf and a deep crimson or nearly black flower and is part of the Corybas trilobus aggregate.

== Description ==
Corybas obscurus is a terrestrial, perennial herb with a single reniform (kidney-shaped) or cordiform (heart-shaped) leaf born on a petiole that is 5.1–40.8 mm long. The leaf itself is 5.8–18.2 × 9.6–26.7 mm and has a mucronate apex. The single flower is held on a peduncle with a small floral bract. The dorsal sepal arches over the labellum and is broad at the apex; it ranges from dark crimson to nearly black. The lateral sepals range from crimson to dark red and are filiform (thread-like), between 11.7 and 20.6 mm long. The petals resemble the lateral sepals but are longer, between 27.3 and 57.2 mm long. The labellum, around 10 mm wide, is auriculate at the base and is strongly curved downwards. It folds inwards and forms a central groove; its margins are very slightly cupped. The inner surface of the labellum is covered with trichomes ending with a compact head (glandular). It is curved at its base, forming a cylindrical opening with a flared, highly fimbriate (toothed) mouth. The surface of the posterior half of the labellum has many hair-like structures that are curved backwards. The labellum is dark crimson or nearly black with a pale green center. The ovary is 3.0–8.4 mm long. The column is 1.6 mm long and curved, and the stigma is flanked with two notched winglike structures. Flowering occurs from October to November.

When not in flower, Corybas obscurus can be confused with other species in the C. trilobus species complex, whose members all share auriculate leaves. In flower, it is similar to Corybas confusus, particularly in terms of the lip color. However, C. obscurus has a short dorsal sepal firmly pressed against the upper border of the labellum and a reniform to cordiform leaf. C. obscurus may be distinguished from C. trilobus by its dark flower coloration and opacity.

== Taxonomy ==
Corybas obscurus was first formally described in 2016 by Carlos Adolfo Lehnebach. Its specific epithet is a Latin word that means "hidden" or "concealed" and refers to the dark color of the flower.

== Distribution and habitat ==
Corybas obscurus occurs in southern beech forest in association with Nothofagus or in forests or shrubland with Kunzea and Leptospermum. It grows in leaf litter. It has been found at elevations from 600 to 1000 m. C. obscurus was first described from the South Island but is known from the North Island as well.
