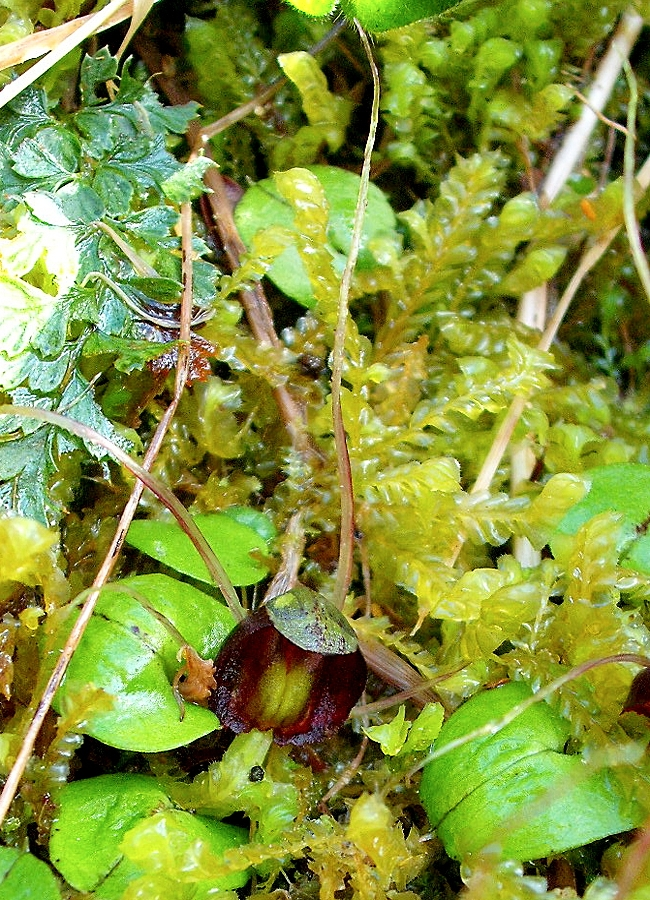
- Corybas confusus in the wild

Scientific classification
- Kingdom: Plantae
- Clade: Tracheophytes
- Clade: Angiosperms
- Clade: Monocots
- Order: Asparagales
- Family: Orchidaceae
- Subfamily: Orchidoideae
- Tribe: Diurideae
- Genus: Corybas
- Species: C. confusus

Binomial name
- Corybas confusus Lehnebach

= Corybas confusus =

Spider orchid

Species of orchid

Corybas confusus, commonly known as the spider orchid is a species of terrestrial orchid endemic to New Zealand. It has a single heart-shaped leaf and a single dark green or light green flower with reddish maroon streaks and blotches and long, thread-like lateral sepals and petals. It grows in highland areas on both main islands.

== Description ==
Corybas confusus is a terrestrial, perennial, deciduous, herb with a single heart-shaped to almost round leaf 9.5–19 mm (0.4–0.7 in) long and 11–21.5 mm (0.4–0.8 in) with a petiole a further 3–31.5 mm (0.1–1 in) long. There is a single erect, dark green or light green flower with reddish maroon streaks and blotches on a peduncle 0.5–8 mm (0.02–0.3 in) long and reaching to a height of 12–30 mm (0.5–1 in). The largest part of the flower is the dorsal sepal which arches and partly forms a hood over the labellum. The lateral sepals are thread-like, whitish or reddish and 13–46 mm (0.5–2 in) long. The petals are similar to the lateral sepals but 27–75 mm (1–3 in). The labellum is dark red with a pale green to yellowish centre, about 7–10 mm (0.3–0.4 in) wide and folded lengthwise forming a groove along its centre line. Flowering occurs from October to December.

In flower, Corybas confusus can easily be mistaken for Corybas obscurus, as both species have a dark maroon coloration and a centrally green labellum. However, C. confusus has a heart-shaped to almost round leaf, while C. obscurus has a distinctly kidney-shaped leaf with prominent auricles at the base.

== Taxonomy ==
Corybas confusus was first formally described in 2016 by Carlos Lehnebach from a specimen collected near Lake Rotoiti in the Nelson Lakes National Park and the description was published in Phytotaxa. The specific epithet (confusus) refers to the similarity of the flowers of this species with those of C. obscurus and to the similarity of the leaf to those of C. macranthus and C. orbiculatus.

== Distribution and habitat ==
This spider orchid grows at altitudes of between 1,000 and 1,100 m (3,000 and 4,000 ft) in leaf litter in southern beech forest and in scrub or grass tussocks. It is found on both the North and South Islands and may also occur on Chatham Island.

== Conservation ==
Corybas confusus is classified as "not threatened" by the New Zealand Government Department of Conservation Threat Classification System.
