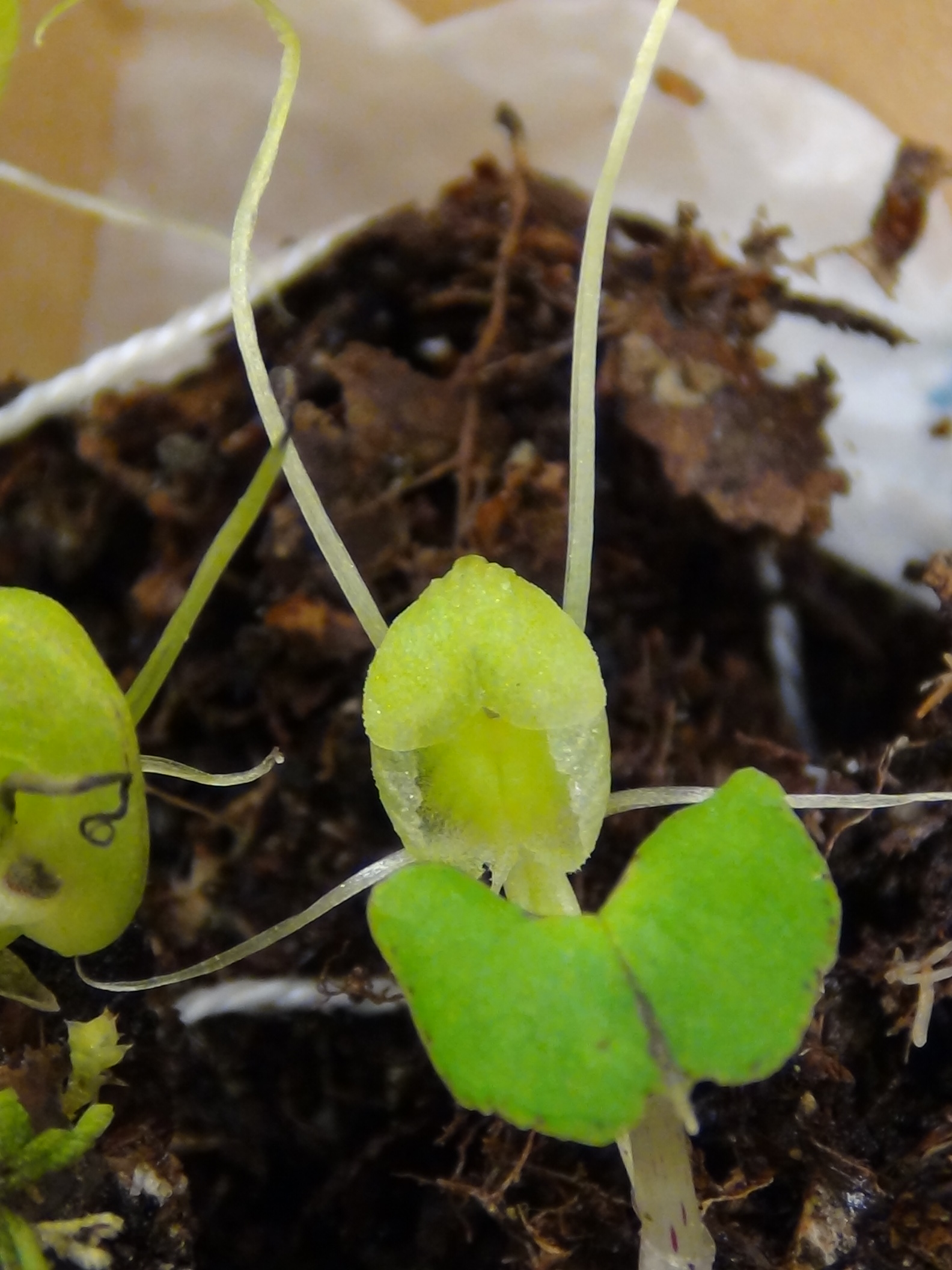
- Corybas walliae growing in New Zealand

Scientific classification
- Kingdom: Plantae
- Clade: Tracheophytes
- Clade: Angiosperms
- Clade: Monocots
- Order: Asparagales
- Family: Orchidaceae
- Subfamily: Orchidoideae
- Tribe: Diurideae
- Subtribe: Acianthinae
- Genus: Corybas
- Species: C. walliae

Binomial name
- Corybas walliae Lehnebach

= Corybas walliae =

Zeller's spider orchid

Species of orchid

Corybas walliae, commonly known as Zeller's spider orchid, is a species of orchid endemic to New Zealand.
