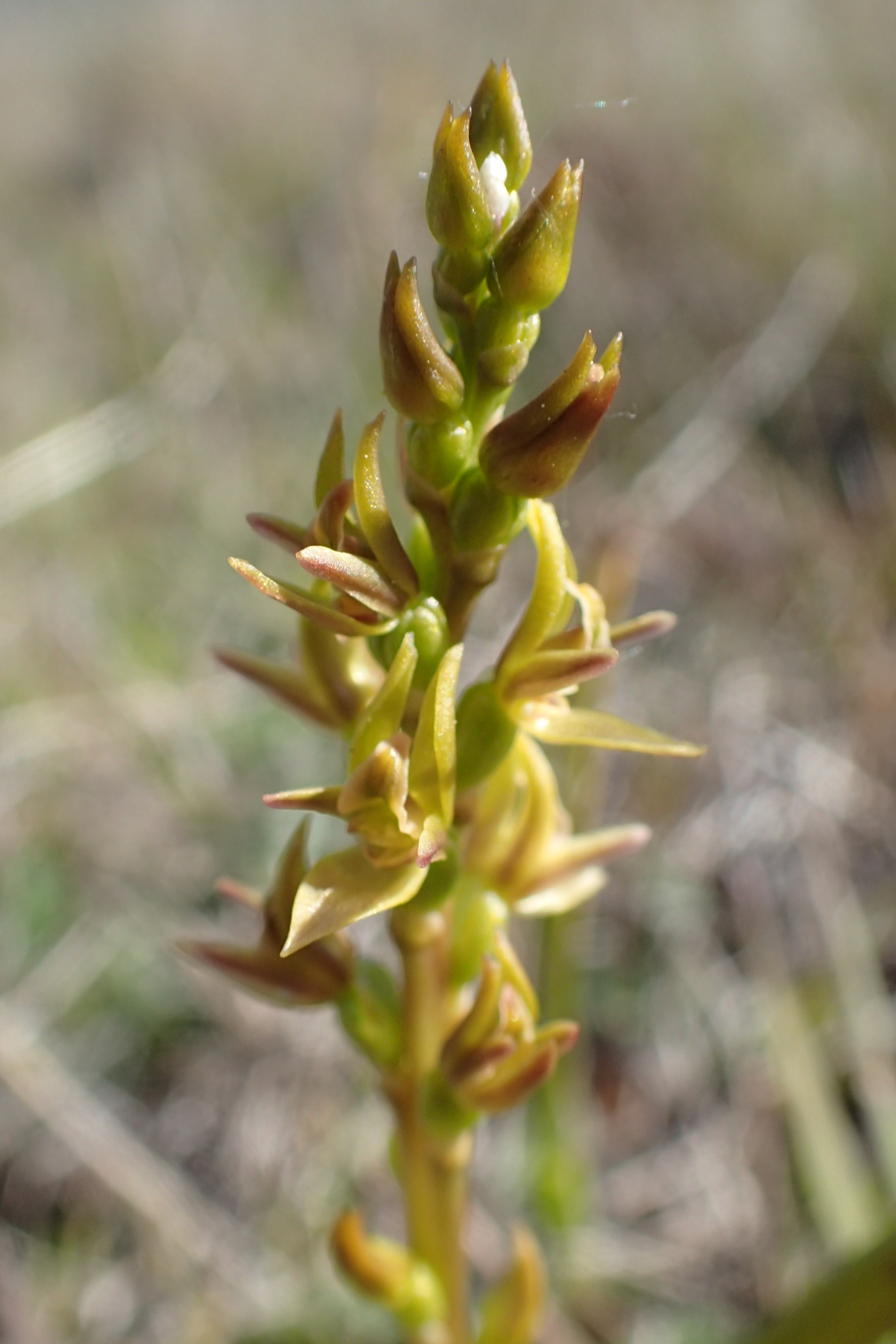
- Near Lake Tekapo

Scientific classification
- Kingdom: Plantae
- Clade: Embryophytes
- Clade: Tracheophytes
- Clade: Spermatophytes
- Clade: Angiosperms
- Clade: Monocots
- Order: Asparagales
- Family: Orchidaceae
- Subfamily: Orchidoideae
- Tribe: Diurideae
- Subtribe: Prasophyllinae
- Genus: Prasophyllum
- Species: P. colensoi

Binomial name
- Prasophyllum colensoi Hook.f.

Synonyms
- Paraprasophyllum colensoi (Hook.f.) M.A.Clem. & D.L.Jones; Prasophyllum pauciflorum Colenso

= Prasophyllum colensoi =

Leek orchid

Species of orchid

Prasophyllum colensoi is a species of orchid endemic to New Zealand where it is commonly known as leek orchid. It has a single tubular, dark green leaf and up to twenty scented, yellowish-green to reddish-brown flowers. It is similar to P. hectori, the only other species of Prasophyllum found in New Zealand, but is distinguished from it by its smaller size, fewer flowers and different habitat.

== Description ==
Prasophyllum colensoi is a terrestrial, perennial, deciduous, herb with an underground tuber and a single dark green, tube-shaped leaf 120–350 mm (5–10 in) long and 2–5 mm (0.08–0.2 in) wide with a whitish base. The free part of the leaf is 80–120 mm (3–5 in) long. Between five and twenty lightly scented flowers are crowded along a flowering spike 30–120 mm (1–5 in) long. The flowers are yellowish-green to reddish-brown and 10–11 mm (0.39–0.43 in) long. As with others in the genus, the flowers are inverted so that the labellum is above the column rather than below it. The dorsal sepal is more or less egg-shaped, 6–7 mm (0.2–0.3 in) long and about 2 mm (0.08 in) wide. The lateral sepals are linear to lance-shaped, about the same size as the dorsal sepal or slightly narrower and almost parallel to each other. The petals are 6–7 mm (0.2–0.3 in) long, about 1.5 mm (0.06 in) wide and turned downwards. The labellum is egg-shaped to lance-shaped, 6–7 mm (0.2–0.3 in) long, about 4 mm (0.2 in) wide with its outer end turned upwards so that the tip often extends between the lateral sepals. There is a thick, fleshy callus in the centre of the labellum. Flowering occurs from October to March.

== Taxonomy and naming ==
Prasophyllum colensoi was first formally described in 1853 by Joseph Dalton Hooker and the description was published in The botany of the Antarctic voyage of H.M. discovery ships Erebus and Terror in the Years 1839-1843. The specific epithet (colensoi) honours William Colenso.

== Distribution and habitat ==
This leek orchid is widespread on both the North and South Islands of New Zealand where it grows in grassland, between herbs and around the edge of bogs.
