= Carlos Lehnebach =

New Zealand botanist

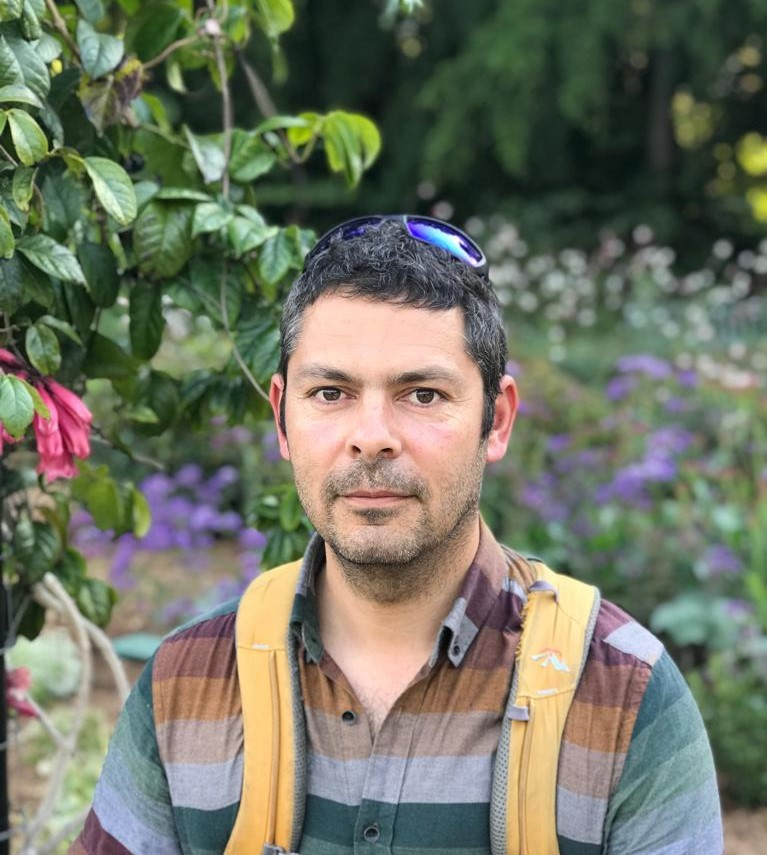
- Born: Carlos Adolfo Lehnebach; Chile
- Education: Massey University
- Awards: Hatch Medal (2017)
- Scientific career
- Fields: Botany
- Workplaces: Museum of New Zealand Te Papa Tongarewa
- Author abbrev. (botany): Lehnebach

Carlos Adolfo Lehnebach is a New Zealand botanist. He is employed as a botany curator at the Museum of New Zealand Te Papa Tongarewa. Lehnebach has a master's degree and a PhD from Massey University.

Lehnebach studies New Zealand orchids. As of January 2018, he has described seven new species of orchid and two species of forget-me-not (Myosotis) indigenous to New Zealand.

== Career ==
Carlos Lehnebach has described multiple new plant species in the Orchidaceae and Boraginaceae. These include the following:

Myosotis (Boraginaceae)

- Myosotis chaffeyorum Lehnebach
- Myosotis mooreana Lehnebach

Corybas (Orchidaceae)

- Corybas confusus Lehnebach
- Corybas obscurus Lehnebach
- Corybas sanctigeorgianus Lehnebach
- Corybas vitreus Lehnebach
- Corybas walliae Lehnebach

Gastrodia (Orchidaceae)

- Gastrodia cooperae Lehnebach & J.R.Rolfe
- Gastrodia molloyi Lehnebach & J.R.Rolfe

== Publications ==
- Lehnebach, Carlos A. (2003). "Preliminary checklist of the orchids of Chile". Botanical Journal of the Linnean Society. 143 (4): 449–451. doi:10.1111/j.1095-8339.2003.00240.x.
- Lehnebach, Carlos A. (2012). "Two new species of forget-me-nots (Myosotis, Boraginaceae) from New Zealand". PhytoKeys (16): 53–64 https://doi.org/10.3897/phytokeys.16.3602. Bibcode:2012PhytK..16...53L. doi:10.3897/phytokeys.16.3602. PMC 3492931. PMID 23233811.
- Lehnebach, Carlos A.; Zeller, Andreas J.; Frericks, Jonathan; Ritchie, Peter (2016). "Five new species of Corybas (Diurideae, Orchidaceae) endemic to New Zealand & phylogeny of the Nematoceras clade". Phytotaxa. 270 (1): 1–24 https://dx.doi.org/10.11646/phytotaxa.270.1.1. Bibcode:2016Phytx.270....1L. doi:10.11646/phytotaxa.270.1.1.
- Lehnebach, Carlos A.; Rolfe, Jeremy R.; Gibbins, Jasmine; Ritchie, Peter (2016). "Two new species of Gastrodia (Gastrodieae, Orchidaceae) endemic to New Zealand". Phytotaxa. 277 (3): 237–254 https://dx.doi.org/10.11646/phytotaxa.277.3.2. Bibcode:2016Phytx.277..237L. doi:10.11646/phytotaxa.277.3.2.
- Frericks, Jonathan; Munkacsi, Andrew; Ritchie, Peter; Luo, Yi-Bo; Lehnebach, Carlos A. (2018). "Phylogenetic affinities and in vitro seed germination of the threatened New Zealand orchid Spiranthes novae-zelandiae" (PDF). New Zealand Journal of Botany. 56 (1): 91–108. Bibcode:2018NZJB...56...91F. doi:10.1080/0028825X.2017.1418398. ISSN 0028-825X.
- Nadarajan, Jayanthi; van der Walt, Karin; Lehnebach, Carlos A.; Saeiahagh, Hassan; Pathirana, Ranjith (2 January 2021). "Integrated ex situ conservation strategies for endangered New Zealand Myrtaceae species". New Zealand Journal of Botany. 59 (1): 72–89. Bibcode:2021NZJB...59...72N. doi:10.1080/0028825X.2020.1754245. ISSN 0028-825X.
- Van der Walt, Karin; Alderton-Moss, Jennifer; Lehnebach, Carlos A. (1 March 2022). "Cross-pollination and pollen storage to assist conservation of Metrosideros bartlettii (Myrtaceae), a critically endangered tree from Aotearoa New Zealand". Pacific Conservation Biology. 29 (2): 141–152. Bibcode:2022PacSB..29..141V. doi:10.1071/PC21054. ISSN 1038-2097.
- Lehnebach, Carlos A.; Alderton-Moss, Jennifer; Shepherd, Lara D. (2025). "A new species of Prasophyllum (Orchidaceae) for New Zealand and lectotypification of P. colensoi". New Zealand Journal of Botany. 0: 1–23. doi:10.1080/0028825X.2025.2454582. ISSN 0028-825X.
