= Pterostylis crassa =

Coarse leafy greenhood

Scientific classification
- Kingdom: Plantae
- Clade: Tracheophytes
- Clade: Angiosperms
- Clade: Monocots
- Order: Asparagales
- Family: Orchidaceae
- Subfamily: Orchidoideae
- Tribe: Cranichideae
- Genus: Pterostylis
- Species: P. crassa

Binomial name
- Pterostylis crassa (D.L.Jones) G.N.Backh.

Synonyms
- Bunochilus crassus D.L.Jones

Species of orchid

Pterostylis crassa, commonly known as the coarse leafy greenhood, is a plant in the orchid family Orchidaceae and is endemic to Victoria. As with similar greenhoods, plants in flower differ from those that are not. Those not in flower have a rosette of leaves on a short stalk but when flowering, plants have up to four relatively large, shiny dark green translucent flowers on a flowering stem with stem leaves.

== Description ==
Pterostylis crassa, is a terrestrial, perennial, deciduous, herb with an underground tuber. When not in flower, plants have a rosette of between three and six leaves, each leaf 10–30 mm (0.4–1 in) long and 4–10 mm (0.2–0.4 in) wide on a stalk 35–55 mm (1–2 in) high. Plants in flower lack a rosette but have up to four flowers on a flowering spike 150–400 mm (6–20 in) high with between three and six linear to lance-shaped stem leaves that are 20–70 mm (0.8–3 in) long and 3–5 mm (0.1–0.2 in) wide. The flowers are 15–19 mm (0.6–0.7 in) long, 7–11 mm (0.3–0.4 in) wide. The dorsal sepal and petals are joined to form a hood called the "galea" over the column. The galea is transparent green with darker green lines and a brown or green, tapered tip. The lateral sepals turn downwards and are 12–15 mm (0.5–0.6 in) long, 7–11 mm (0.3–0.4 in) wide and joined for about half their length. The labellum is 7–8 mm (0.28–0.31 in) long, about 3–4 mm (0.1–0.2 in) wide and light brown with a dark stripe along its mid-line. Flowering occurs from September to October.

== Taxonomy and naming ==
The coarse leafy greenhood was first formally described in 2006 by David Jones and given the name Bunochilus crassus. The description was published in Australian Orchid Research. In 2007, Gary Backhouse changed the name to Pterostylis crassa. The specific epithet (crassa) is a Latin word meaning "thick", "fat" or "stout", referring to the thick, fleshy flowers of this species.

== Distribution and habitat ==
Pterostylis crassa occurs in dry woodland and forest in the far north-east corner of Victoria.
