= Pterostylis macrosceles =

Slender rufous greenhood

Scientific classification
- Kingdom: Plantae
- Clade: Tracheophytes
- Clade: Angiosperms
- Clade: Monocots
- Order: Asparagales
- Family: Orchidaceae
- Subfamily: Orchidoideae
- Tribe: Cranichideae
- Genus: Pterostylis
- Species: P. macrosceles

Binomial name
- Pterostylis macrosceles (D.L.Jones & C.J.French) D.L.Jones

Synonyms
- Oligochaetochilus macrosceles D.L.Jones & C.J.French

Species of orchid

Pterostylis macrosceles, commonly known as the slender rufous greenhood is a plant in the orchid family Orchidaceae and is endemic to the south-west of Western Australia. Both flowering and non-flowering plants have a relatively large rosette of leaves. Flowering plants also have between four and eight white flowers with green brown lines and small, insect-like labellum. It is distinguished from other Western Australian greenhoods by the unusually long thread-like tips on its sepals.

== Description ==
Pterostylis macrosceles is a terrestrial, perennial, deciduous, herb with an underground tuber and a leaf rosette which is 40–80 mm (2–3 in) wide. Flowering plants have a rosette at the base of the flowering stem but the leaves are usually withered by flowering time. Between four and eight or more translucent white flowers with green or brown lines are borne on a flowering stem 100–350 mm (4–10 in) tall. The flowers lean forward and are 30–50 mm (1–2 in) long and 10–12 mm (0.4–0.5 in) wide. The dorsal sepal and petals form a hood or "galea" over the column with the dorsal sepal having a long, narrow tip on its end. The lateral sepals turn downwards and suddenly narrow to thin, unusually long thread-like tips. The labellum is fleshy, dark brown, hairy and insect-like. Flowering occurs from September to October.

== Taxonomy and naming ==
This greenhood was first formally described in 2014 by David Jones and Christopher French and given the name Oligochaetochilus macrosceles from a specimen collected near Yellowdine and the description was published in Australian Orchid Review. The genus Oligochaetochilus is not accepted as distinct from Pterostylis by most taxonomists and in 2015 David Jones changed the name to Pterostylis macrosceles "to allow for the different taxonomic views held at generic level". The specific epithet (macrosceles) is derived from the Ancient Greek words makros meaning "long" and skelos meaning "leg" referring to the long tips on the sepals.

== Distribution and habitat ==
The slender rufous greenhood is usually found growing in shallow soil on granite outcrops between Goomalling and Queen Victoria Rocks south of Coolgardie in the Avon Wheatbelt, Coolgardie, Mallee and Yalgoo biogeographic regions.

== Conservation ==
Pterostylis macrosceles is classified as "not threatened" by the Western Australian Government Department of Parks and Wildlife.
