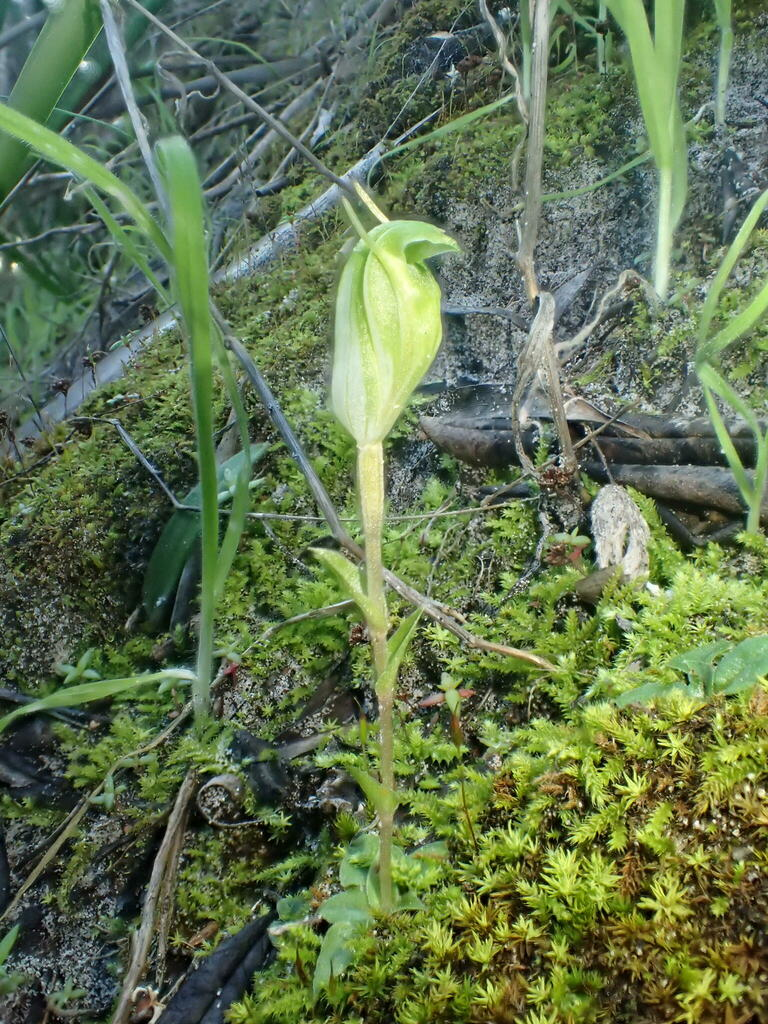

Scientific classification
- Kingdom: Plantae
- Clade: Tracheophytes
- Clade: Angiosperms
- Clade: Monocots
- Order: Asparagales
- Family: Orchidaceae
- Subfamily: Orchidoideae
- Tribe: Cranichideae
- Genus: Pterostylis
- Species: P. actites

Binomial name
- Pterostylis actites (D.L.Jones & C.J.French) D.L.Jones & C.J.French

Synonyms
- Diplodium actites D.L.Jones & C.J.French; Pterostylis sp. Coastal clubbed sepals (G.Brockman GBB 255) WA Herbarium

= Pterostylis actites =

Species of orchid endemic to Western Australia

Pterostylis actites, commonly known as the coastal short-eared snail orchid, is a species of greenhood orchid endemic to south-western Australia.

== Description ==
Pterostylis actites is a herbaceous terrestrial orchid with a loose basal rosette of 4-7 ovate leaves, green in colour, each measuring 5–17 mm (0.20–0.67 in) long and 4–10 mm (0.16–0.39 in) wide. When flowering, this species produces a single flower on a stalk measuring 30–100 mm (1.2–3.9 in) tall with 3-4 stem leaves. The flowers are a translucent white with green stripes and markings, 10–15 mm (0.39–0.59 in) long, and are notable for their extremely short and thick lateral sepals. Flowering occurs from July to September.

== Distribution and habitat ==
Pterostylis actites is restricted to south-western Western Australia, occurring along the coast between Perth and Israelite Bay. It is common within this range, which includes a number of reserves and national parks. It can often be found within metres of the beach, growing on stabilised coastal dunes and in near-coastal heath and woodlands.

== Taxonomy and naming ==
Diplodium actites was described in 2019 by David L. Jones and Christopher J. French based on a type specimen collected in 2000 from Nornalup, Western Australia. The specific epithet actites is derived from the Greek word aktites, meaning "shore dweller", as this species was noted for growing close to the sea. In 2020, Jones and French transferred this species to the genus Pterostylis. Texts published before 2019 often used a variation of the name Pterostylis sp. Coastal clubbed sepals to refer to this species, alluding to its coastal distribution and thick lateral sepals.

== Conservation status ==
Pterostylis actites is listed as not threatened by the Government of Western Australia Department of Biodiversity, Conservation and Attractions.
