= Pterostylis pearsonii =

Scientific classification
- Kingdom: Plantae
- Clade: Tracheophytes
- Clade: Angiosperms
- Clade: Monocots
- Order: Asparagales
- Family: Orchidaceae
- Subfamily: Orchidoideae
- Tribe: Cranichideae
- Genus: Pterostylis
- Species: P. pearsonii

Binomial name
- Pterostylis pearsonii (D.L.Jones) Janes & Duretto

Synonyms
- Oligochaetochilus pearsonii D.L.Jones

Species of orchid

Pterostylis pearsonii is a plant in the orchid family Orchidaceae and is endemic to Queensland. It was first formally described in 2010 by David Jones and given the name Oligochaetochilus pearsonii. The description was published in the journal The Orchadian from a specimen grown in the Australian National Botanic Gardens from a tuber collected near Eungella Dam. In 2010, Jasmine Janes and Marco Duretto changed the name to Pterostylis pearsonii.
