= Pterostylis petrosa =

Riverina rustyhood

Scientific classification
- Kingdom: Plantae
- Clade: Tracheophytes
- Clade: Angiosperms
- Clade: Monocots
- Order: Asparagales
- Family: Orchidaceae
- Subfamily: Orchidoideae
- Tribe: Cranichideae
- Genus: Pterostylis
- Species: P. petrosa

Binomial name
- Pterostylis petrosa D.L.Jones & M.A.Clem.

Synonyms
- Oligochaetochilus petrosus (D.L.Jones & M.A.Clem.) D.L.Jones & M.A.Clem.

Species of orchid

Pterostylis petrosa, commonly known as the Riverina rustyhood, is a plant in the orchid family Orchidaceae, endemic to New South Wales, Australia. It has a rosette of leaves at its base and up to eight dark brown flowers with transparent "windows", long spreading tips on the lateral sepals and a thin, brown, insect-like labellum.

== Description ==
Pterostylis petrosa, is a terrestrial, perennial, deciduous, herb with an underground tuber. It has a rosette of between six and ten egg-shaped leaves at the base of the flowering spike, each leaf 15–25 mm (0.6–1 in) long and 6–9 mm (0.2–0.4 in) wide. The leaves are often withered by the time of flowering. Up to eight dark brown flowers with translucent panels and 30–38 mm (1.2–1.5 in) long, 10–12 mm (0.4–0.5 in) wide are borne on a flowering spike 90–150 mm (4–6 in) tall. Each flower is carried on the end of a thin stalk 14–20 mm (0.6–0.8 in) long. There are between two and four stem leaves with their bases wrapped around the flowering spike. The dorsal sepal and petals are joined to form a hood called the "galea" over the column with the dorsal sepal having a thread-like tip 8–10 mm (0.3–0.4 in) long. The lateral sepals are turned downwards and are wider than the galea. They are shallowly dished, hairy on their outer edges and suddenly taper to a thread-like tip, 14–20 mm (0.6–0.8 in). The labellum is brown, thin and insect-like, 7–9 mm (0.3–0.4 in) long and about 3 mm (0.1 in) wide with two long hairs on the "head" end and nine to twelve shorter hairs on each side of the "body". Flowering occurs from September to November.

== Taxonomy and naming ==
Pterostylis petrosa was first formally described in 1983 by David Jones and Mark Clements from a specimen collected near The Rock and the description was published in Muelleria. The specific epithet (petrosa) is a Latin word meaning "rocky" or "stony", referring to the habitat where this orchid grows, and to the type location.

== Distribution and habitat ==
The Riverina rustyhood occurs in the Riverina area where it grows on a few stony hills in rock crevices and on ledges.
