= Pterostylis pedina =

Scientific classification
- Kingdom: Plantae
- Clade: Tracheophytes
- Clade: Angiosperms
- Clade: Monocots
- Order: Asparagales
- Family: Orchidaceae
- Subfamily: Orchidoideae
- Tribe: Cranichideae
- Genus: Pterostylis
- Species: P. pedina

Binomial name
- Pterostylis pedina (D.L.Jones) Janes & Duretto

Synonyms
- Oligochaetochilus pedinus D.L.Jones

Species of orchid

Pterostylis pedina is a plant in the orchid family Orchidaceae and is endemic to New South Wales where in grows on the south-west plains. It was first formally described in 2009 by David Jones and given the name Oligochaetochilus pedinus. The description was published in the journal The Orchadian from a specimen grown in Yass from a material collected near Hay. In 2010, Jasmine Janes and Marco Duretto changed the name to Pterostylis pedina. The specific epithet (pedina) is derived from the Ancient Greek word pedinos meaning "flat" or "level".
