= Pterostylis splendens =

Conservation status
- Least Concern (IUCN 3.1)

Scientific classification
- Kingdom: Plantae
- Clade: Tracheophytes
- Clade: Angiosperms
- Clade: Monocots
- Order: Asparagales
- Family: Orchidaceae
- Subfamily: Orchidoideae
- Tribe: Cranichideae
- Genus: Pterostylis
- Species: P. splendens

Binomial name
- Pterostylis splendens D.L.Jones & M.A.Clem.

Synonyms
- Taurantha splendens (D.L.Jones & M.A.Clem.) D.L.Jones & M.A.Clem.; Diplodium splendens (D.L.Jones & M.A.Clem.) D.L.Jones & M.A.Clem.

Species of orchid

Pterostylis splendens is a species of orchid endemic to New Caledonia. It was first formally described in 1998 by David Jones and Mark Alwin Clements from a specimen cultivated at the Australian National Botanic Gardens from material collected in New Caledonia. The description was published in The Orchadian. This greenhood orchid is found in damp forest and maquis on ultramafic soils at altitudes of 700 to 1,300 m (2,000 to 4,000 ft).
