= Pterostylis xerophila =

Desert greenhood

Conservation status
- Vulnerable (EPBC Act)

Scientific classification
- Kingdom: Plantae
- Clade: Tracheophytes
- Clade: Angiosperms
- Clade: Monocots
- Order: Asparagales
- Family: Orchidaceae
- Subfamily: Orchidoideae
- Tribe: Cranichideae
- Genus: Pterostylis
- Species: P. xerophila

Binomial name
- Pterostylis xerophila M.A.Clem.

Synonyms
- Oligochaetochilus xerophilus (M.A.Clem.) Szlach.

Species of orchid

Pterostylis xerophila, commonly known as the desert greenhood, is a plant in the orchid family Orchidaceae and is endemic to South Australia. Both flowering and non-flowering plants have a relatively large rosette of leaves. Flowering plants also have up to eight translucent white, green and reddish-brown flowers with an insect-like labellum.

== Description ==
Pterostylis xerophila is a terrestrial, perennial, deciduous, herb with an underground tuber and a rosette of between three and ten leaves. The leaves are 10–30 mm (0.4–1 in) long and 5–8 mm (0.2–0.3 in) wide. Flowering plants have a rosette at the base of the flowering stem but the leaves are usually withered by flowering time. Up to eight white, green and reddish-brown flowers 25–30 mm (0.98–1.2 in) long and 9–11 mm (0.35–0.43 in) wide are borne on a flowering stem 60–200 mm (2–8 in) tall. The dorsal sepal and petals form a hood or "galea" over the column with the dorsal sepal having a narrow, upturned tip 6–8 mm (0.2–0.3 in) long. The lateral sepals turn downwards, are wider than the galea, dished, and suddenly taper to narrow tips 20–25 mm (0.8–1 in) long. The labellum is insect-like, about 4 mm (0.2 in) long, 2–3 mm (0.08–0.1 in) wide with a thin "body" and a thickened "head" end. Each side of the labellum has four to six forward-pointing bristles up to 3 mm (0.1 in) long. Flowering occurs from September to November.

== Taxonomy and naming ==
Pterostylis xerophila was first formally described in 1986 by Mark Clements from a specimen grown in Adelaide from material collected in the Great Victoria Desert. The description was published in the fourth edition of the Flora of South Australia. The specific epithet (xerophila) is derived from the Ancient Greek words ξερός (xeros), meaning “dry” and φίλος (phílos), meaning "dear one" or "friend".

Its common name as listed on the Commonwealth's SPRAT database is desert greenhood.

== Distribution and habitat ==
The desert greenhood usually grows in granite or quartzite rock outcrops in areas receiving an average annual rainfall of less than 200 mm (8 in), in and near the Great Victoria Desert.

== Conservation ==
Pterostylis xerophila is classified as "vulnerable" under the Australian Government Environment Protection and Biodiversity Conservation Act 1999 and the South Australian Government National Parks and Wildlife Act 1972. Little is known about the threats to this greenhood but include grazing by feral rabbits and goats, weed invasion, accidental destruction by vehicle movement and inappropriate fire regimes.
