= Pterostylis borealis =

Scientific classification
- Kingdom: Plantae
- Clade: Tracheophytes
- Clade: Angiosperms
- Clade: Monocots
- Order: Asparagales
- Family: Orchidaceae
- Subfamily: Orchidoideae
- Tribe: Cranichideae
- Genus: Pterostylis
- Species: P. borealis

Binomial name
- Pterostylis borealis D.L.Jones & M.A.Clem.

Synonyms
- Speculantha borealis D.L.Jones

Species of orchid

Pterostylis borealis is a species of flowering plant in the orchid family Orchidaceae and is endemic to north Queensland. It is a glabrous, tuberous, terrestrial herb with spreading rosette leaves and smooth, green, white and light brown flowers.

== Description ==
Pterostylis borealis, is a glabrous, terrestrial herb that typically grows to a height of 9–25 mm (0.35–0.98 in) and has an underground tuber. It has 3 to 7 spreading rosette leaves 3–10 mm (0.12–0.39 in) long and 3–7 mm (0.12–0.28 in) wide, but are lost by the time flowering occurs. Up to 3 green and white flowers, flushed with light brown, are borne on pedicels 1–3 mm (0.039–0.118 in) long, each flower 8–10 mm (0.31–0.39 in) long and 3.5–4 mm (0.14–0.16 in) wide. The dorsal sepal and petals are fused, forming a hood or "galea" over the column, the dorsal sepal egg-shaped to lance-shaped, 10–12 mm (0.39–0.47 in) long and 5–6 mm (0.20–0.24 in) wide. The lateral sepals are held close to the galea and are deeply notched, 2.0–2.5 mm (0.079–0.098 in) wide and joined for 5–7 mm (0.20–0.28 in) long. The petals are oblong, 8–10 mm (0.31–0.39 in) long and 2.0–2.5 mm (0.079–0.098 in) wide and the labellum is 3.2–3.7 mm (0.13–0.15 in) long, 1.5–1.8 mm (0.059–0.071 in) wide with a raised, pale brown callus. The column is 5.0–6.5 mm (0.20–0.26 in) long with wings about 2 mm (0.079 in) long. Flowering occurs in late winter and autumn.

== Taxonomy and naming ==
This greenhood orchid was first formally described in 2016 by David Jones who gave it the name Speculantha borealis from specimens collected on St. Patricks Hills in Herberton in 1991 and description was published in Australian Orchid Review. In 2017, Jones transferred the species to Pterostylis as P. borealis. The specific epithet (borealis) means "northern", referring to the most northerly distribution of this orchid.

== Distribution and habitat ==
Pterostylis borealis grows in gravelly soil of granite boulders in open forest and is only known form the Atherton and Evelyn Tablelands in north-eastern Queensland.

== Conservation status ==
Pterostylis borealis is classified as "special least vulnerable" under the Queensland Government Nature Conservation Act 1992.
