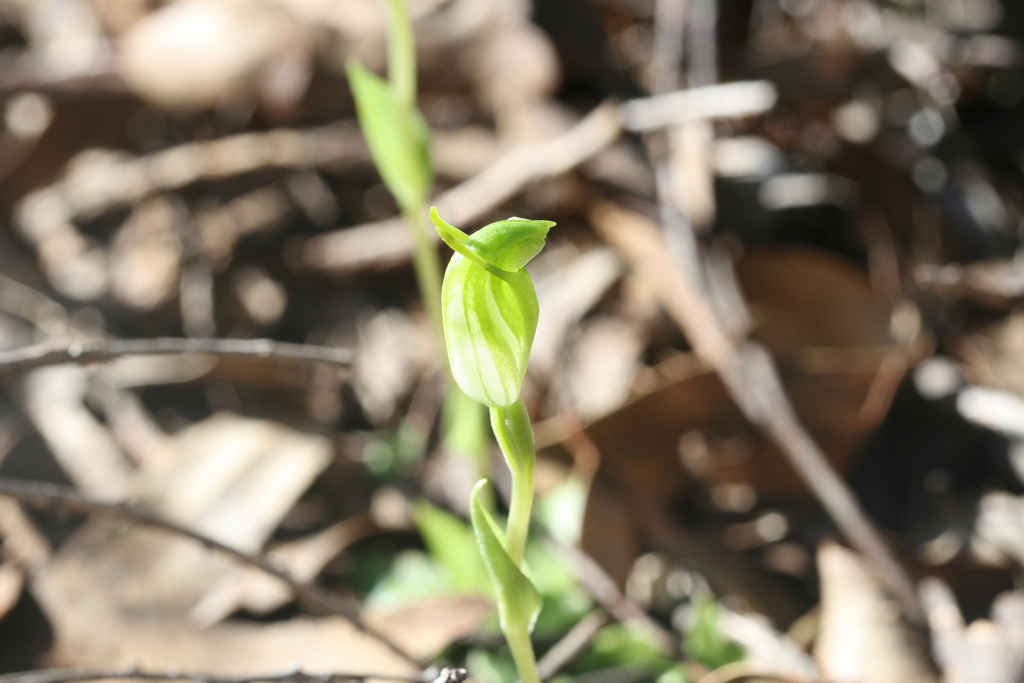
- Near Morangup

Scientific classification
- Kingdom: Plantae
- Clade: Tracheophytes
- Clade: Angiosperms
- Clade: Monocots
- Order: Asparagales
- Family: Orchidaceae
- Subfamily: Orchidoideae
- Tribe: Cranichideae
- Genus: Pterostylis
- Species: P. brevisepala

Binomial name
- Pterostylis brevisepala (D.L.Jones & C.J.French) D.L.Jones & C.J.French

Synonyms
- Diplodium brevisepalum D.L.Jones & C.J.French

= Pterostylis brevisepala =

Species of plant

Pterostylis brevisepala, commonly known as short-eared snail orchid, is a species of orchid endemic to the south-west of Western Australia. It has a loose rosette of leaves at the base of the plant, and a single green and white flower.

== Description ==
Pterostylis brevisepala is a terrestrial, perennial, herb that typically grows to a height of 70–200 mm (2.8–7.9 in) tall and has a rosette of dull green, egg-shaped to elliptical leaves 10–16 mm (0.39–0.63 in) long and 5–10 mm (0.20–0.39 in) wide on a petiole 2–7 mm (0.079–0.276 in) long. There are 3 to 6 egg-shaped leaves on the stem, 8–17 mm (0.31–0.67 in) long 4–6 mm (0.16–0.24 in) wide. Usually only a single green and white flower 13–15 mm (0.51–0.59 in) long and 5–6 mm (0.20–0.24 in) wide is borne on the flowering stem. The dorsal sepal and petals are fused, forming a hood or "galea" over the column and the dorsal sepal has a short point. The dorsal sepal is 16–18 mm (0.63–0.71 in) long, the lateral sepals tightly embrace the galea and are 6–10 mm (0.24–0.39 in) long. The petals are 12–15 mm (0.47–0.59 in) long and 4.0–4.5 mm (0.16–0.18 in) wide and strongly curved. The labellum is oblong to elliptical, about 5 mm (0.20 in) long and 2 mm (0.079 in) wide. Flowering occurs from August to early October.

== Taxonomy and naming ==
This greenhood was first formally described in 2019 by David Jones and Christopher French who gave it the name Diplodium brevisepalum from a specimen collected by French in 2004. In 2018, Jones and French transferred the species to Pterostylis as P. brevisepala. The specific epithet (brevisepala) means "short sepals".

== Distribution and habitat ==
Short-eared snail orchid grows in sand in woodland and on the edges of swamps in near-coastal areas between Perth and Lancelin.

== Conservation ==
Pterostylis brevisepala is listed as "not threatened" in Western Australia by the Government of Western Australia Department of Parks and Wildlife.
