= Pterostylis hadra =

Scientific classification
- Kingdom: Plantae
- Clade: Tracheophytes
- Clade: Angiosperms
- Clade: Monocots
- Order: Asparagales
- Family: Orchidaceae
- Subfamily: Orchidoideae
- Tribe: Cranichideae
- Genus: Pterostylis
- Species: P. hadra

Binomial name
- Pterostylis hadra (D.L.Jones & C.J.French) D.L.Jones

Synonyms
- Oligochaetochilus hadrus D.L.Jones

Species of orchid

Pterostylis hadra is a plant in the orchid family Orchidaceae and is endemic to the south-west of Western Australia. It was first formally described in 2015 by David Jones and Christopher French and given the name Oligochaetochilus hadrus. The description was published in the journal Australian Orchid Review from a specimen collected near Cranbrook. In the same year, Jones changed the name to Pterostylis hadra "to allow for the different taxonomic views held at generic level within the subtribe". The specific epithet (hadra) is derived from the Ancient Greek word hadros meaning "stout", "strong" or "great", referring to the robust habit of this species.
