= Pterostylis flavovirens =

Coastal banded greenhood

Scientific classification
- Kingdom: Plantae
- Clade: Tracheophytes
- Clade: Angiosperms
- Clade: Monocots
- Order: Asparagales
- Family: Orchidaceae
- Subfamily: Orchidoideae
- Tribe: Cranichideae
- Genus: Pterostylis
- Species: P. flavovirens

Binomial name
- Pterostylis flavovirens (D.L.Jones) R.J.Bates

Synonyms
- Bunochilus flavovirens D.L.Jones

Species of orchid

Pterostylis flavovirens, commonly known as the coastal banded greenhood, is a plant in the orchid family Orchidaceae that is endemic to South Australia. As with other similar orchids, non-flowering plants differ from those in flower. Flowering plants have up to seven pale to translucent green flowers with darker green stripes. The flowers have an insect-like labellum which is yellowish green with a slightly darker green stripe along its centre. Non-flowering plants have a rosette of leaves on a stalk, but flowering plants lack the rosette, instead having three to six stem leaves.

== Description ==
Pterostylis flavovirens, is a terrestrial, perennial, deciduous, herb with an underground tuber. Non-flowering plants have a rosette of between three and five egg-shaped leaves, each leaf 5–27 mm (0.2–1 in) long and 3–9 mm (0.1–0.4 in) wide on a stalk 20–50 mm (0.8–2 in) tall. Flowering plants have up to seven transparent pale to translucent green flowers with darker green stripes on a flowering spike 30–200 mm (1–8 in) high. The flowering spike has between three and six egg-shaped stem leaves which are 5–40 mm (0.2–2 in) long and 2–9 mm (0.08–0.4 in) wide. The dorsal sepal and petals are fused, forming a hood or "galea" over the column with the dorsal sepal 12–15 mm (0.5–0.6 in) long and shallowly curved with a brownish tip. The petals are 9–12 mm (0.4–0.5 in) long, about 2 mm (0.08 in) wide with narrow flanges on their outer edges. The lateral sepals are 9–13.5 mm (0.4–0.5 in) and joined for all but about 3 mm (0.1 in), forming a structure 4–6 mm (0.16–0.24 in) wide. The labellum is insect-like, 4.5–6 mm (0.18–0.24 in) long, about 2 mm (0.08 in) wide, with a darker green stripe along its centre and a mound on the "head" end. Flowering occurs from July to September.

== Taxonomy and naming ==
This orchid was first formally described in 2006 by David Jones who gave it the name Bunochilus flavovirens. The description was published in the journal Australian Orchid Research from a specimen collected near Port Lincoln. In 2008 Robert Bates changed the name to Pterostylis flavovirens. The specific epithet (flavovirens) is derived from the Latin words flavus meaning “golden-yellow” or "yellow" and virens meaning "green", referring to the colour of the labellum.

== Distribution and habitat ==
Pterostylis flavovirens is found in coastal areas of the Eyre Peninsula, Yorke Peninsula, Southern Lofty, Kangaroo Island and South-Eastern botanical regions of South Australia. It often grows in accumulated leaf litter under small trees and shrubs.
