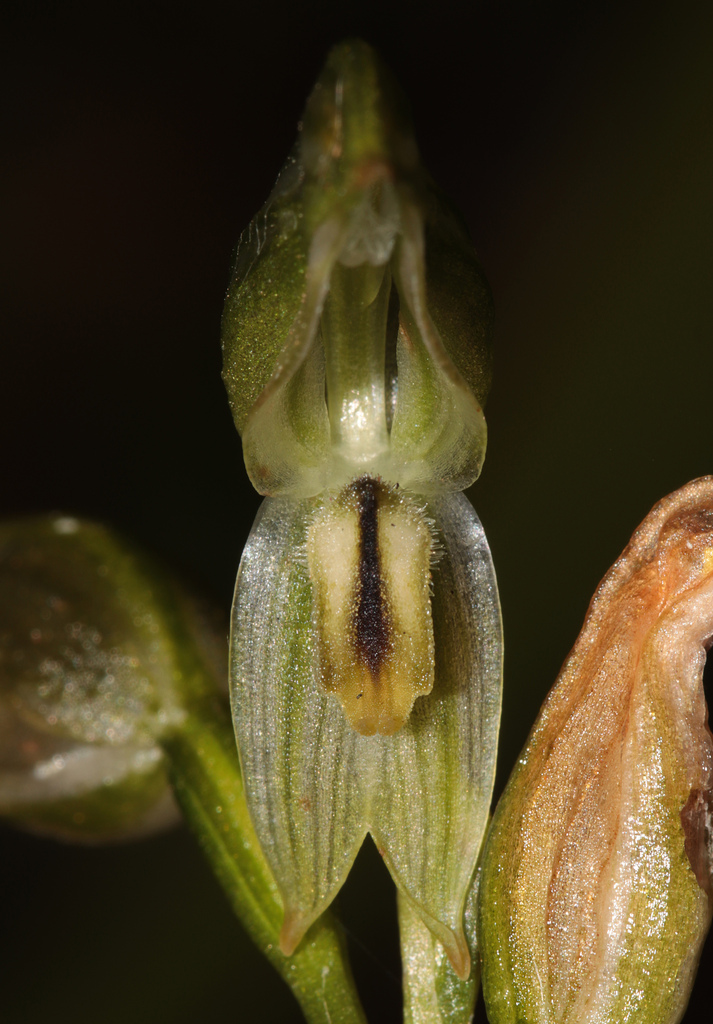

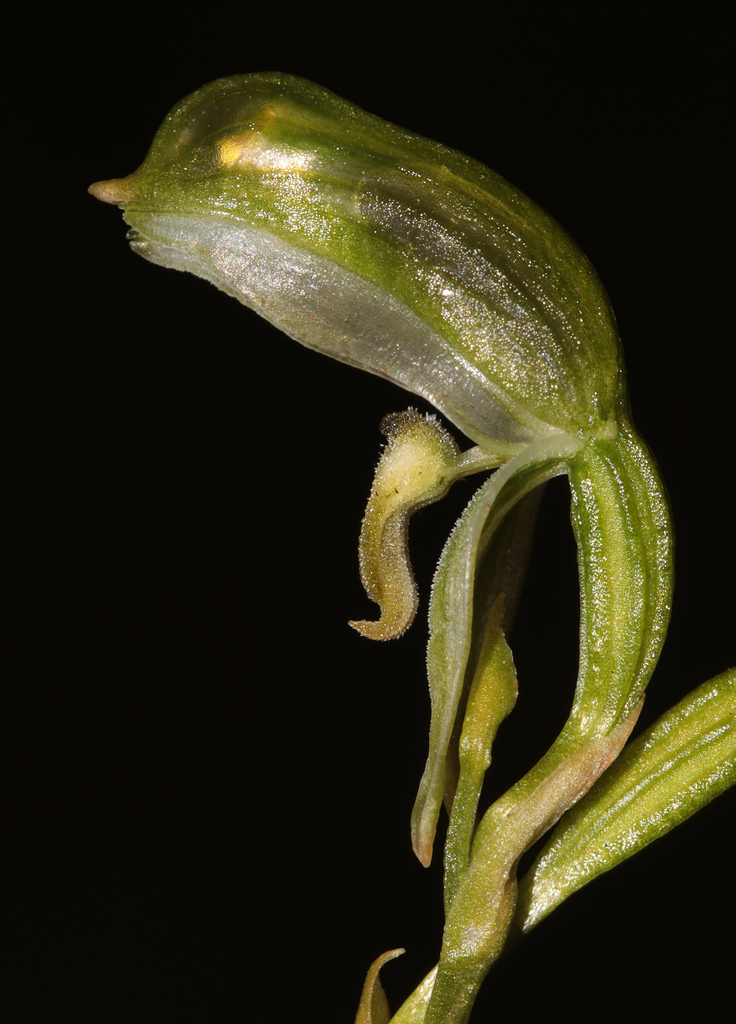

Scientific classification
- Kingdom: Plantae
- Clade: Tracheophytes
- Clade: Angiosperms
- Clade: Monocots
- Order: Asparagales
- Family: Orchidaceae
- Subfamily: Orchidoideae
- Tribe: Cranichideae
- Genus: Pterostylis
- Species: P. loganii

Binomial name
- Pterostylis loganii (D.L.Jones) G.N.Backh.

Synonyms
- Bunochilus littoralis D.L.Jones

= Pterostylis loganii =

Logan's leafy greenhood

Species of orchid

Pterostylis loganii, commonly known as the Logan's leafy greenhood, is a plant in the orchid family Orchidaceae and is endemic to a small area near the border between New South Wales and Victoria. Flowering plants have up to five pale green flowers with darker green stripes and brownish tips. The flowers have a brown labellum with a blackish stripe and a blackish mound near its base. Non-flowering plants have a rosette of leaves on a short, thin stalk but flowering plants lack the rosette, instead having five to seven stem leaves.

== Description ==
Pterostylis littoralis, is a terrestrial, perennial, deciduous, herb with an underground tuber. Non-flowering plants have a rosette of between three and five egg-shaped leaves which are 10–30 mm (0.4–1 in) long and 2–5 mm (0.08–0.2 in) wide and on a thin stalk. Flowering plants have up to nine pale green flowers with darker green stripes on a flowering spike 150–500 mm (6–20 in) high. The flowers are 10–15 mm (0.4–0.6 in) long and the flowering stem has between five and seven linear to lance-shaped stem leaves which are 10–60 mm (0.4–2 in) long and 3–7 mm (0.1–0.3 in) wide. The dorsal sepal and petals are fused, forming a hood or "galea" over the column with the dorsal sepal having a short point on its brownish tip. The lateral sepals turn downwards and are 9–12 mm (0.4–0.5 in) long, 5–7 mm (0.2–0.3 in) wide, joined for part of their length and have narrow brownish tips 3–4 mm (0.12–0.16 in) long. The labellum is 5–6 mm (0.20–0.24 in) long, about 2 mm (0.08 in) wide and pale green with a dark brown line along its centre and a dark brown mound near its base. Flowering occurs from August to October.

== Taxonomy and naming ==
This leafy greenhood was first formally described in 2006 by David Jones who gave it the name Bunochilus loganii and published the description in Australian Orchid Research from a specimen collected near Carabost. In 2008 Gary Backhouse changed the name to Pterostylis loganii. The specific epithet (loganii) honours Alan Edward Logan, a farmer and naturalist who discovered the species and collected the type specimen.

== Distribution and habitat ==
Pterostylis loganii grows in forest with grasses and shrubs in the far north-east of Victoria and the southern tablelands and slopes of New South Wales.
