= Pterostylis orbiculata =

Coastal banded greenhood

Scientific classification
- Kingdom: Plantae
- Clade: Tracheophytes
- Clade: Angiosperms
- Clade: Monocots
- Order: Asparagales
- Family: Orchidaceae
- Subfamily: Orchidoideae
- Tribe: Cranichideae
- Genus: Pterostylis
- Species: P. orbiculata

Binomial name
- Pterostylis orbiculata (D.L.Jones & C.J.French) D.L.Jones & C.J.French

Synonyms
- Urochilus orbiculatus D.L.Jones & C.J.French

Species of orchid

Pterostylis orbiculata, commonly known as the coastal banded greenhood, is a plant in the orchid family Orchidaceae and is endemic to the south-west of Western Australia. The plants either have a rosette of leaves in the years when not flowering or stem leaves on a flowering spike. When flowering, it has up to twenty flowers that are reddish brown, greenish brown or green with a reddish or brownish labellum with short stiff hairs.

== Description ==
Pterostylis orbiculata, is a terrestrial, perennial, deciduous, herb with an underground tuber. Non-flowering plants have a rosette of between three and six, egg-shaped leaves, each leaf 8–15 mm (0.3–0.6 in) long and 5–10 mm (0.2–0.4 in) wide, the leaves on a stalk 10–20 mm (0.4–0.8 in) long. When flowering, there are between two and twenty reddish brown, greenish brown or green flowers with translucent white areas borne on a flowering stem 100–250 mm (4–10 in) high. The flowering stem has between six and twelve lance-shaped to egg-shaped stem leaves which are 35–45 mm (1–2 in) long and 4–9 mm (0.2–0.4 in) wide. The flowers are 15–18 mm (0.6–0.7 in) long and 6–9 mm (0.2–0.4 in) wide. The dorsal sepal and petals form a hood over the column. The dorsal sepal is 14–18 mm (0.6–0.7 in) long with a smooth surface and the petals are 9–11 mm (0.35–0.43 in) long, about 4 mm (0.2 in) wide and almost straight. The lateral sepals turn downwards and joined for most of their length forming an almost circular structure 12–14 mm (0.5–0.6 in) long and wide. The labellum is oblong, 4–5 mm (0.16–0.20 in) long, about 3 mm (0.1 in) wide, reddish or brownish and covered with short, stiff hairs. Flowering occurs from June to early August.

== Taxonomy and naming ==
The coastal banded greenhood was first formally described in 2017 by David Jones and Christopher French and given the name Urochilus orbiculatus. The description was published in Australian Orchid Review from a specimen collected near Mogumber. In 2018 the same authors changed the name to Pterostylis orbiculata "to allow for the different taxonomic views held at generic level within the subtribe". It had previously been known as Pterostylis sp. 'coastal'. The specific epithet (orbiculata) is a Latin word meaning "circular", referring to the shape formed by the fused lateral sepals.

== Distribution and habitat ==
Pterostylis orbiculata occurs in Western Australia from north of Geraldton to Bunbury with a few populations further inland. It grows in shruland, woodland and forest, sometimes around granite outcrops.
