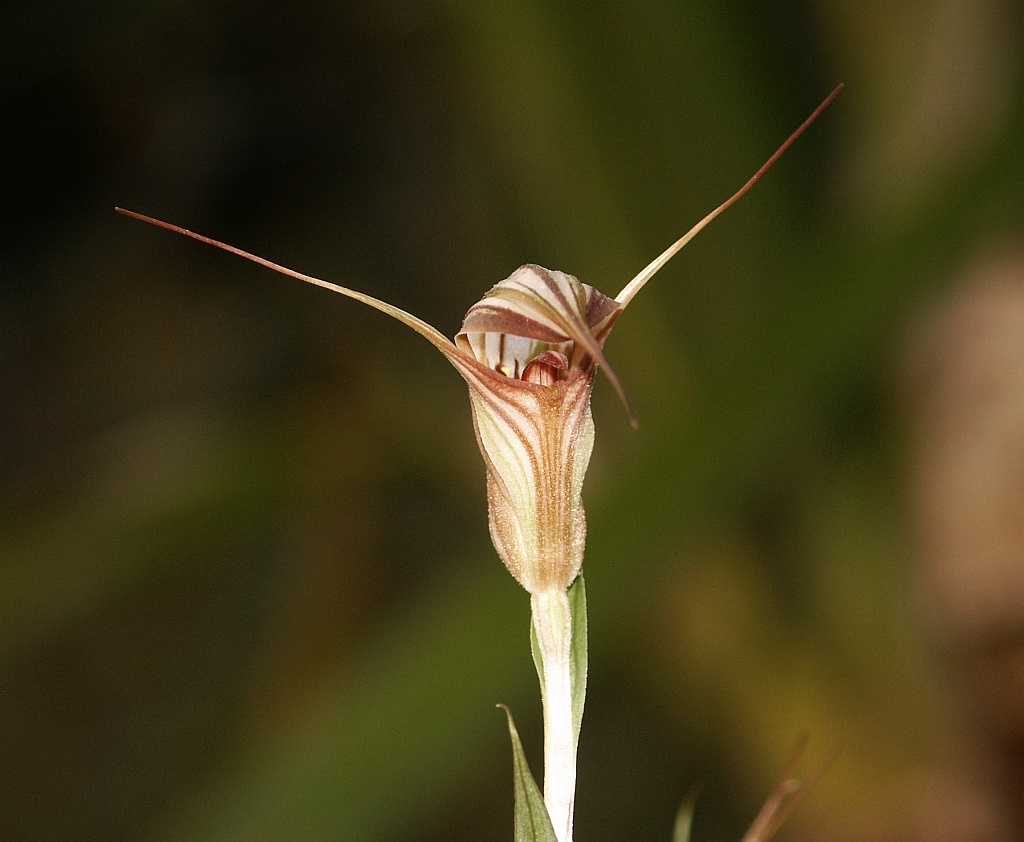
- Pterostylis coccina

Scientific classification
- Kingdom: Plantae
- Clade: Tracheophytes
- Clade: Angiosperms
- Clade: Monocots
- Order: Asparagales
- Family: Orchidaceae
- Subfamily: Orchidoideae
- Tribe: Cranichideae
- Subtribe: Pterostylidinae
- Genus: Pterostylis; R.Br., 1810

Type species
- Pterostylis curta R.Br., 1810

Synonyms
- List: Diplodium Sw.; Oligochaetochilus Szlach.; Plumatichilos Szlach.; Bunochilus D.L.Jones & M.A.Clem.; Crangonorchis D.L.Jones & M.A.Clem.; Eremorchis D.L.Jones & M.A.Clem.; Hymenochilus D.L.Jones & M.A.Clem.; Linguella D.L.Jones & M.A.Clem.; Petrorchis D.L.Jones & M.A.Clem.; Pharochilum D.L.Jones & M.A.Clem.; Ranorchis D.L.Jones & M.A.Clem.; Speculantha D.L.Jones & M.A.Clem.; Stamnorchis D.L.Jones & M.A.Clem.; Taurantha D.L.Jones & M.A.Clem.; Urochilus D.L.Jones & M.A.Clem.

= Pterostylis =

Greenhood

Genus of plants

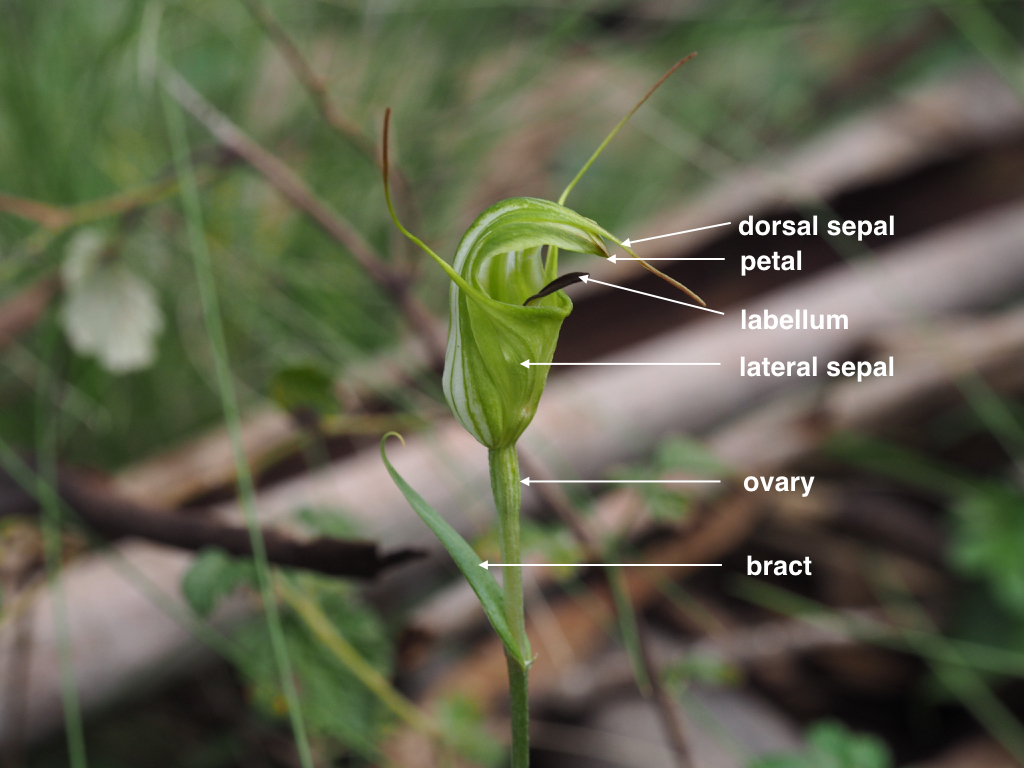
Labelled diagram of Pterostylis metcalfei

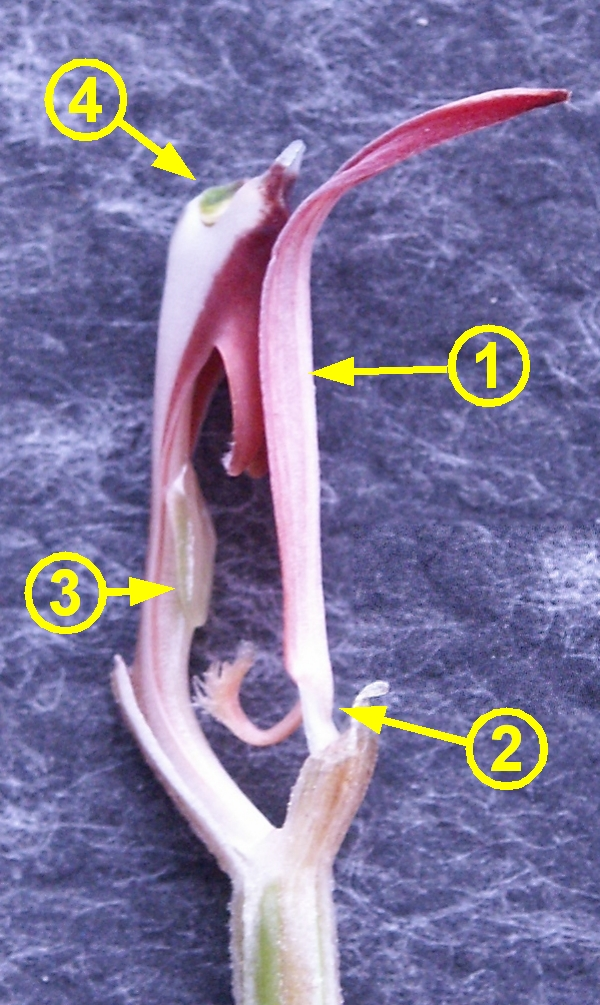
Pterostylis coccina, sepals and petals removed (1) - labellum (2) - hinge (3) - stigma (4) - pollinia

Pterostylis is a genus of about 300 species of plants in the orchid family, Orchidaceae. Commonly called greenhood orchids, they are terrestrial, deciduous, perennial, tuberous, herbs found in Australia, New Zealand, New Guinea, New Caledonia and one Indonesian island. The flowers are mostly green, sometimes with brown, reddish or white stripes, and are distinguished from other orchids by their unusual flower structures and pollination mechanism.

== Description ==
Greenhood orchids are all terrestrial herbs with an underground tuber like many other genera of orchids but are distinguished by a hood-like "galea" formed by the fusing of the dorsal sepal and two lateral petals. The galea curves forward, covers the sexual parts of the flower, is important in the pollination process and is about as long as the two petals. The dorsal sepal is translucent white with green, reddish or brown stripes. The two lateral sepals are joined at their base, form the front of the flower and usually protrude to form "points" or "ears" which extend above or to the side of the galea. The third (medial) petal forms the highly modified labellum. As in other orchids, the sexual parts of the flower form part of the column and in all greenhoods, this structure has a pair of mostly translucent wings and is also important in pollination.

The tuber of a greenhood is usually more or less spherical in shape and lasts for about a year then dies. A new one is produced early in the life of the parent tuber at the same time as a new shoot is produced and continues to grow, reaching maturity at the end of the growing season. In some species, a larger number of "daughter" tubers grow, and a colony of orchids is produced. The leaves are either attached in a rosette to the base of the peduncle or "stalk" of the plant by a short petiole, or further up it, in which case the leaves are sessile. There may be one or several flowers on the peduncle.

The fruit of a greenhood is a dehiscent capsule containing up to 500 tiny seeds and is oblong to elliptic in shape with three ridges. Other parts of the flower wither soon after pollination and the dry remains are attached to the end of the capsule.

== Taxonomy and naming ==
The first observation of Pterostylis by European botanists was probably by Joseph Banks when HMS Endeavour visited Botany Bay in 1770 but any specimens collected were lost later in the voyage. The first formal description of a greenhood was by Jacques Labillardière who collected a specimen from Bruny Island and gave it the name Disperis alata. After several name changes, Disperis alata is now known as Pterostylis alata. John White, the first surgeon-general of the colony of New South Wales collected several species and George Caley collected 208 greenhood specimens from 16 species and described them in great detail, including details of their habitat and gave them names like Druids Cap patersoni but did not publish his work.

The genus Pterostylis was first raised by Robert Brown who formally described 19 species but did not nominate a type species. The species he described were collected from the east coast of the mainland and from Tasmania and the descriptions were published in Prodromus Florae Novae Hollandiae.

Alan Cunningham was the first to describe a New Zealand species, P. banksii and John Lindley described the first four Western Australian species, P. vittata, P. pyramidalis, P. barbata and P. scabra from specimens collected by James Drummond. About 300 species are recognised and about 200 of them have been formally described and named.

In 2001 the genus Pterostylis was split such that two new genera, Plumatichilos and Oligochaetochilus, were established based on morphological characters. These divisions effectively separated species with a thread-like, feathery labellum (Plumatichilos), and those with downward-curved lateral sepals (Oligochaetochilus) from the remaining Pterostylis species. The following year, David Jones and Mark Clements proposed further separating Pterostylis into sixteen genera based on a combination of molecular and morphological characters: the genera Bunochilus, Crangonorchis, Diplodium, Eremorchis, Hymenochilus, Linguella, Oligochaetochilus, Petrorchis, Pharochilum, Plumatichilos, Ranorchis, Speculantha, Stamnorchis, Taurantha and Urochilus. These changes were not adopted widely by Australian herbaria as the data appeared to support a monophyletic group. In 2010, further molecular work reinstated Pterostylis as a monophyletic group with two subgenera distinguishing species with lateral sepals that are bent sharply downwards ("deflexed") from those with the lateral sepals bent backwards ("recurved").

The genus name (Pterostylis) is derived from the Greek words pteron meaning 'wing' and stylos meaning 'pillar' or 'post', but in orchids, generally applies to the column.

The closest relative of Pterostylis is Achlydosa, restricted to New Caledonia and the sole other genus of subtribe Pterostylidinae.

== Distribution and habitat ==
Orchids in the genus Pterostylis occur mostly in Australia but are also found in New Zealand, including some of its smaller islands such as Chatham Island, and in New Caledonia, New Guinea, New Britain, New Ireland and on Seram Island in Indonesia. In Australia they are found in all states and Lord Howe Island, but not in the Northern Territory. They grow in a wide range of habitats, especially in temperate zones and are found in grassland, heath, scrub, woodland and forest, including rainforest. They sometimes grow in semi-arid areas but usually near rocks or crevices where there is run-off during rain. In tropical regions they tend to grow at higher altitudes where temperatures are lower. Most have periods of dormancy which coincide with climatic extremes, surviving as small tubers until favourable conditions return.

== Ecology ==
Most greenhoods are pollinated by insects, nearly always by tiny flies from the family Mycetophilidae or by mosquitoes (Family Culicidae). The insect approaches the flower from downwind, as if attracted by a scent and usually lands on the galea. (In the case of Pterostylis sanguinea, the pollinator is a male fungus gnat of the genus Mycomya which attempts to copulate with the labellum, which produces the chemical attractant.) The insect then enters the flower and either because it has passed a balance point, or because it has touched a sensitive part of the labellum, the labellum moves forward trapping the insect between the column wings, the labellum and other flower parts. Observation of the insect's reaction to entrapment is difficult to observe, but in its struggle to escape, it either deposits pollinia from a previously visited flower or contacts the sticky viscidium and pollinia are attached, then carried to another flower. The features of an actively-moving labellum, along with the galea, are unique to these orchids.

== Uses ==
=== Use in horticulture ===
Greenhoods are easily grown in pots and usually flower well, filling the pot in a few years. Pterostylis curta and P. nutans can be grown in commercial orchid potting mix with coarse gravel added. A bushhouse or cool glasshouse are needed for some species. Greenhoods need regular watering in the growing seaseon but must be kept dry when dormant.

== Species ==
The following is a list of species of Pterostylis accepted by Plants of the World Online as at January 2023, apart from Pterostylis striata, a name that is accepted by the Australian Plant Census:

- Pterostylis abrupta D.L.Jones – tablelands greenhood
- Pterostylis aciculiformis (Nicholls) M.A.Clem. & D.L.Jones – needle-point rustyhood, slender ruddyhood
- Pterostylis actites (D.L.Jones & C.J.French) D.L.Jones & C.J.French - coastal short-eared snail orchid
- Pterostylis acuminata R.Br. – sharp greenhood, pointed greenhood
- Pterostylis × aenigma D.L.Jones & M.A.Clem. – enigmatic greenhood
- Pterostylis aestiva D.L.Jones – long-tongued summer greenhood
- Pterostylis agathicola D.L.Jones, Molloy & M.A.Clem. – kauri greenhood (N.Z.)
- Pterostylis agrestis (D.L.Jones) G.N.Backh.
- Pterostylis alata (Labill.) Rchb.f. – striped greenhood
- Pterostylis allantoidea R.S.Rogers – shy greenhood
- Pterostylis alobula (Hatch) L.B.Moore - winter greenhood (N.Z.)
- Pterostylis alpina R.S.Rogers – mountain greenhood
- Pterostylis alveata Garnet – coastal greenhood
- Pterostylis amabilis (D.L.Jones & L.M.Copel.) D.L.Jones
- Pterostylis ampliata (D.L.Jones) D.L.Jones – large autumn greenhood
- Pterostylis anaclasta (D.L.Jones) Janes & Duretto
- Pterostylis anatona D.L.Jones – Eungella greenhood
- Pterostylis aneba D.L.Jones
- Pterostylis angulata (D.L.Jones & C.J.French) D.L.Jones & C.J.French – Helena River snail orchid, limestone snail orchid
- Pterostylis angusta A.S.George – narrow-hooded shell orchid, narrow shell orchid
- Pterostylis antennifera (D.L.Jones) D.L.Jones
- Pterostylis aphylla Lindl. – leafless greenhood
- Pterostylis aquilonia D.L.Jones & B.Gray – northern cobra greenhood
- Pterostylis arbuscula (D.L.Jones & C.J.French) D.L.Jones & C.J.French – dark banded greenhood
- Pterostylis arenicola M.A.Clem. & J.Stewart – sandhill rustyhood
- Pterostylis areolata Petrie (N.Z.)
- Pterostylis aspera D.L.Jones & M.A.Clem. – rough shell orchid
- Pterostylis atrans D.L.Jones – dark-tip greenhood, blunt-tongue greenhood
- Pterostylis atriola D.L.Jones – Snug greenhood
- Pterostylis atrosanguinea D.L.Jones & C.J.French
- Pterostylis auriculata Colenso (N.Z.)
- Pterostylis australis Hook.f. – southern greenhood (N.Z.)
- Pterostylis banksii A.Cunn. (N.Z.)
- Pterostylis baptistii Fitzg. – king greenhood
- Pterostylis barbata Lindl. – western bearded greenhood, bird orchid
- Pterostylis barringtonensis (D.L.Jones) G.N.Backh. – Barrington leafy greenhood
- Pterostylis basaltica D.L.Jones & M.A.Clem. – basalt rustyhood, basalt greenhood
- Pterostylis bicolor M.A.Clem. & D.L.Jones – black-tip greenhood
- Pterostylis bicornis D.L.Jones & M.A.Clem. – horned greenhood
- Pterostylis biseta Blackmore & Clemesha – bristled rustyhood
- Pterostylis boormanii Rupp – Sikh's whiskers, baggy britches, or Boorroans green-hood
- Pterostylis borealis (D.L.Jones) D.L.Jones
- Pterostylis bracteata (D.L.Jones & R.J.Bates) J.M.H.Shaw
- Pterostylis brevichila D.L.Jones & C.J.French – dwarf shell orchid
- Pterostylis brevisepala (D.L.Jones & C.J.French) D.L.Jones & C.J.French
- Pterostylis brinsleyi (D.L.Jones) J.M.H.Shaw
- Pterostylis brumalis L.B.Moore – kauri greenhood (N.Z.)
- Pterostylis brunneola D.L.Jones & C.J.French – giant snail orchid
- Pterostylis bryophila D.L.Jones – Hindmarsh Valley greenhood
- Pterostylis bureaviana Schltr. (New Caledonia)
- Pterostylis calceolus M.A.Clem. – Bungonia rustyhood
- Pterostylis caligna M.T.Mathieson
- Pterostylis cardiostigma D.Cooper (N.Z.)
- Pterostylis caulescens L.O.Williams (New Guinea)
- Pterostylis cernua D.L.Jones, Molloy & M.A.Clem. – Westland greenhood (N.Z.)
- Pterostylis chaetophora M.A.Clem. & D.L.Jones – Taree rustyhood, tall rusthood or ruddy hood
- Pterostylis cheraphila D.L.Jones & M.A.Clem. – floodplain rustyhood
- Pterostylis chlorogramma D.L.Jones & M.A.Clem. – green-striped leafy greenhood
- Pterostylis chocolatina (D.L.Jones) G.N.Backh. – chocolate-lip leafy greenhood
- Pterostylis ciliata M.A.Clem. & D.L.Jones – hairy rufous greenhood, tall rusthood or hairy rustyhood
- Pterostylis clavigera Fitzg. – hairy snail orchid
- Pterostylis clivicola (D.L.Jones) G.N.Backh.
- Pterostylis clivosa (D.L.Jones) D.L.Jones
- Pterostylis cobarensis M.A.Clem. – inland rustyhood, Cobar rustyhood
- Pterostylis coccina Fitzg. – scarlet greenhood
- Pterostylis collina (Rupp) M.A.Clem. & D.L.Jones – shiny bull orchid
- Pterostylis commutata D.L.Jones – midland rustyhood
- Pterostylis concava D.L.Jones & M.A.Clem. – pouched greenhood, cupped banded greenhood
- Pterostylis concinna R.Br. – trim greenhood
- Pterostylis conferta (D.L.Jones) G.N.Backh. – leprechaun greenhood, basalt midget greenhood
  - Pterostylis conferta (D.L.Jones) G.N.Backh. subsp. conferta
  - Pterostylis conferta subsp. occidentalis (R.J.Bates) J.M.H.Shaw
- Pterostylis × conoglossa Upton
- Pterostylis corpulenta (D.L.Jones) D.L.Jones
- Pterostylis crassa (D.L.Jones) G.N.Backh. – coarse leafy greenhood
- Pterostylis crassicaulis (D.L.Jones & M.A.Clem.) G.N.Backh. – alpine swan greenhood
- Pterostylis crassichila D.L.Jones – plump northern greenhood
- Pterostylis crebra (D.L.Jones) D.L.Jones
- Pterostylis crebriflora (D.L.Jones & C.J.French) D.L.Jones & C.J.French
- Pterostylis crispula (D.L.Jones & C.J.French) D.L.Jones & C.J.French
- Pterostylis cucullata R.Br. – leafy greenhood
- Pterostylis curta R.Br. – blunt greenhood
- Pterostylis cycnocephala Fitzg. – swan greenhood
- Pterostylis daintreana F.Muell. ex Benth. – Daintree's greenhood
- Pterostylis decurva R.S.Rogers – summer greenhood
- Pterostylis depauperata F.M.Bailey – keeled greenhood
- Pterostylis despectans (Nicholls) M.A.Clem. & D.L.Jones – lowly rustyhood
- Pterostylis dilatata A.S.George – robust snail orchid
- Pterostylis diminuta (D.L.Jones) G.N.Backh. – small-flowered leafy greenhood
- Pterostylis divaricata (D.L.Jones & L.M.Copel.) L.M.Copel. & D.L.Jones
- Pterostylis diversiflora (R.J.Bates) J.M.H.Shaw
- Pterostylis dolichochila D.L.Jones & M.A.Clem. – long-tongued shell orchid
- Pterostylis dubia R.Br. – blue-tongued greenhood
- Pterostylis echinulata D.L.Jones & C.J.French – hairy-leafed snail orchid
- Pterostylis ectypha (D.L.Jones & C.J.French) D.L.Jones & C.J.French
- Pterostylis elegans D.L.Jones – elegant greenhood
- Pterostylis elegantissima (D.L.Jones & C.J.French) D.L.Jones – elegant rufous greenhood
- Pterostylis erecta T.E.Hunt - upright maroonhood
- Pterostylis eremaea (D.L.Jones & C.J.French) D.L.Jones & C.J.French
- Pterostylis erubescens D.L.Jones & C.J.French – red sepaled snail orchid
- Pterostylis erythroconcha M.A.Clem. & D.L.Jones – red shell orchid
- Pterostylis exalla (D.L.Jones) G.N.Backh.
- Pterostylis excelsa M.A.Clem. – tall rustyhood, dry land green-hood
- Pterostylis exquisita (D.L.Jones) D.L.Jones
- Pterostylis exserta (D.L.Jones) D.L.Jones – exserted rufous greenhood
- Pterostylis extensa (D.L.Jones) D.L.Jones
- Pterostylis extranea (D.L.Jones) Janes & Duretto
- Pterostylis faceta (D.L.Jones & C.J.French) D.L.Jones & C.J.French
- Pterostylis falcata R.S.Rogers – sickle greenhood
- Pterostylis ferruginea (D.L.Jones) G.N.Backh. – Bangham rustyhood
- Pterostylis fischii Nicholls – Fisch's greenhood
- Pterostylis flavovirens (D.L.Jones) R.J.Bates – coastal banded greenhood
- Pterostylis foliacea (D.L.Jones) D.L.Jones
- Pterostylis foliata Hook.f. – slender greenhood
- Pterostylis frenchii (D.L.Jones) A.P.Br. – tuart rufous greenhood
- Pterostylis fuliginosa (D.L.Jones & C.J.French) D.L.Jones & C.J.French
- Pterostylis furcata Lindl. – forked greenhood
- Pterostylis × furcillata Rupp
- Pterostylis furva (D.L.Jones) D.L.Jones
- Pterostylis galgula (D.L.Jones & C.J.French) D.L.Jones & C.J.French
- Pterostylis gibbosa R.Br. – Illawarra rustyhood, Illawarra greenhood
- Pterostylis glebosa D.L.Jones & C.J.French – clubbed snail orchid
- Pterostylis glyphida (D.L.Jones) G.N.Backh.
- Pterostylis gracilis Nicholls
- Pterostylis gracillima (D.L.Jones & C.J.French) D.L.Jones & C.J.French
- Pterostylis graminea Hook.f. – grass-leaved greenhood (N.Z.)
- Pterostylis grandiflora R.Br. – superb greenhood, cobra greenhood
- Pterostylis grossa (D.L.Jones & C.J.French) D.L.Jones
- Pterostylis hadra (D.L.Jones) D.L.Jones
- Pterostylis hamata Blackmore & Clemesha – southern hooked rustyhood
- Pterostylis hamiltonii Nicholls – red-veined shell orchid
- Pterostylis heberlei (D.L.Jones & C.J.French) D.L.Jones & C.J.French
- Pterostylis hians D.L.Jones – opera house orchid
- Pterostylis hildae Nicholls – rainforest greenhood
- Pterostylis hispidula Fitzg. – small nodding greenhood, box greenhood
- Pterostylis humilis R.S.Rogers (N.Z.)
- Pterostylis incognita (D.L.Jones) G.N.Backh. – Sale greenhood
- Pterostylis × ingens (Rupp) D.L.Jones
- Pterostylis insectifera M.A.Clem. – insect-lipped rufous greenhood, leaden rustyhood
- Pterostylis irsoniana Hatch (N.Z.)
- Pterostylis irwinii D.L.Jones (N.Z.)
- Pterostylis jacksonii D.L.Jones & C.J.French – southwest granite snail orchid
- Pterostylis jeanesii Reiter, Kosky & M.A.Clem.
- Pterostylis jonesii G.N.Backh. – montane leafy greenhood
- Pterostylis karri D.L.Jones & C.J.French – karri snail orchid
- Pterostylis laxa Blackmore – antelope greenhood
- Pterostylis lepida (D.L.Jones) G.N.Backh. – Halbury greenhood
- Pterostylis leptochila M.A.Clem. & D.L.Jones – Ravensthorpe rufous greenhood, narrow-lipped rustyhood
- Pterostylis limbatus (D.L.Jones & R.J.Bates) J.M.H.Shaw
- Pterostylis lineata (D.L.Jones) G.N.Backh. – Blue Mountains leafy greenhood
- Pterostylis lingua M.A.Clem. – large-lipped rustyhood
- Pterostylis littoralis (D.L.Jones) R.J.Bates – coastal leafy greenhood
- Pterostylis loganii (D.L.Jones) G.N.Backh. – Logan's leafy greenhood
- Pterostylis longicornis (D.L.Jones & C.J.French) D.L.Jones & C.J.French
- Pterostylis longicurva Rupp – long-tongued greenhood
- Pterostylis longifolia R.Br. – common leafy greenhood, tall greenhood
- Pterostylis longipetala Rupp – curved greenhood
- Pterostylis lortensis D.L.Jones & C.J.French – Lort River snail orchid
- Pterostylis lustra D.L.Jones – small sickle greenhood
- Pterostylis macilenta (D.L.Jones) G.N.Backh.
- Pterostylis macrocalymma M.A.Clem. & D.L.Jones – large-hooded rufous greenhood, Murchison rustyhood
- Pterostylis macrosceles (D.L.Jones & C.J.French) D.L.Jones – slender rufous greenhood
- Pterostylis macrosepala (D.L.Jones) G.N.Backh.
- Pterostylis major (D.L.Jones) G.N.Backh.
- Pterostylis maxima M.A.Clem. & D.L.Jones – large rustyhood
- Pterostylis melagramma D.L.Jones – black-stripe leafy greenhood
- Pterostylis meridionalis (D.L.Jones & C.J.French) D.L.Jones & C.J.French
- Pterostylis metcalfei D.L.Jones – Metcalfe's greenhood, large kinked greenhood or Ebor greenhood
- Pterostylis microglossa D.L.Jones & C.J.French – Kalbarri shell orchid
- Pterostylis micromega Hook.f. – swamp greenhood (N.Z.)
- Pterostylis microphylla D.L.Jones & C.J.French – small rosette snail orchid
- Pterostylis mirabilis (D.L.Jones) R.J.Bates – nodding rufous-hood
- Pterostylis mitchellii Lindl. – Mitchell's rustyhood
- Pterostylis montana Hatch (N.Z.)
- Pterostylis monticola D.L.Jones – large mountain greenhood
- Pterostylis multiflora (D.L.Jones) G.N.Backh. – tall tiny greenhood
- Pterostylis multisignata (D.L.Jones) D.L.Jones
- Pterostylis mutica R.Br. – midget greenhood
- Pterostylis mystacina (D.L.Jones) Janes & Duretto
- Pterostylis nana R.Br. – dwarf snail orchid
- Pterostylis nichollsiana (D.L.Jones) D.L.Jones
- Pterostylis nigricans D.L.Jones & M.A.Clem. – dark greenhood
- Pterostylis nutans R.Br. – nodding greenhood, parrot's beak orchid
- Pterostylis oblonga D.L.Jones – coastal maroonhood
- Pterostylis obtusa R.Br. – blunt greenhood
- Pterostylis oliveri Petrie (N.Z.)
- Pterostylis ophioglossa R.Br. – snake-tongue greenhood
- Pterostylis orbiculata D.L.Jones & C.J.French coastal banded greenhood
- Pterostylis oreophila Clemesha – Kiandra greenhood, blue-tongued greenhood
- Pterostylis ovata M.A.Clem. – Gawler Range rustyhood
- Pterostylis paludosa D.L.Jones, Molloy & M.A.Clem. – swamp greenhood
- Pterostylis papuana Rolfe
- Pterostylis parca (D.L.Jones) G.N.Backh. – Lithgow leafy greenhood
- Pterostylis parva D.L.Jones & C.J.French – fawn snail orchid
- Pterostylis parviflora R.Br. - tiny greenhood
- Pterostylis patens Colenso (N.Z.)
- Pterostylis peakalliana Reiter, Kosky & M.A.Clem.
- Pterostylis pearsonii (D.L.Jones) Janes & Duretto
- Pterostylis pedina (D.L.Jones) Janes & Duretto
- Pterostylis pedoglossa Fitzg. – prawn greenhood
- Pterostylis pedunculata R.Br. – upright maroonhood
- Pterostylis perculta (D.L.Jones & C.J.French) D.L.Jones – ruddy hood
- Pterostylis petiolata (D.L.Jones) D.L.Jones
- Pterostylis petrosa D.L.Jones & M.A.Clem. – Riverina rustyhood
- Pterostylis picta M.A.Clem. – painted rufous greenhood, painted rustyhood
- Pterostylis planulata D.L.Jones & M.A.Clem. – flat rustyhood
- Pterostylis platypetala D.L.Jones & C.J.French – broad petaled snail orchid
- Pterostylis plumosa Cady - bearded greenhood, plumed greenhood
- Pterostylis porrecta D.L.Jones, Molloy & M.A.Clem. (N.Z.)
- Pterostylis praetermissa M.A.Clem. & D.L.Jones – Mount Kaputar rustyhood
- Pterostylis prasina (D.L.Jones) G.N.Backh. – mallee leafy greenhood
- Pterostylis pratensis D.L.Jones – Liawenee greenhood
- Pterostylis precatoria (D.L.Jones & C.J.French) D.L.Jones & C.J.French
- Pterostylis procera D.L.Jones & M.A.Clem. – short-lipped greenhood
- Pterostylis psammophila (D.L.Jones) R.J.Bates – two-bristle greenhood
- Pterostylis puberula Hook.f. – dwarf greenhood, snail greenhood (N.Z.)
- Pterostylis pulchella Messmer – waterfall greenhood, escarpment greenhood or pretty greenhood
- Pterostylis pusilla R.S.Rogers – tiny rustyhood
- Pterostylis pyramidalis Lindl. - tall snail orchid, leafy snail orchid
- Pterostylis × ralphcranei D.L.Jones & M.A.Clem.
- Pterostylis readii (D.L.Jones & L.M.Copel.) D.L.Jone
- Pterostylis recurva Benth. – jug orchid, recurved shell orchid, antelope orchid or bull orchid
- Pterostylis reflexa R.Br. – dainty greenhood
- Pterostylis repanda (M.A.Clem. & D.L.Jones) J.M.H.Shaw
- Pterostylis revoluta R.Br. – autumn greenhood
- Pterostylis riparia D.L.Jones – streamside greenhood
- Pterostylis robusta R.S.Rogers – sharp-leaf greenhood
- Pterostylis roensis M.A.Clem. & D.L.Jones – painted rufous greenhood, dark rustyhood
- Pterostylis rogersii E.Coleman – curled-tongue shell orchid
- Pterostylis rubenachii D.L.Jones – Arthur River greenhood
- Pterostylis rubescens (D.L.Jones) G.N.Backh. – blushing tiny greenhood
- Pterostylis rubiginosa (D.L.Jones & L.M.Copel.) L.M.Copel. & D.L.Jones
- Pterostylis rufa R.Br. - red rustyhood
- Pterostylis russellii T.E.Hunt – Russell's greenhood
- Pterostylis sanguinea D.L.Jones & M.A.Clem. – red-banded greenhood, dark-banded greenhood
- Pterostylis sargentii C.R.P.Andrews – frog greenhood
- Pterostylis saxicola D.L.Jones & M.A.Clem. – Sydney plains rustyhood, Sydney plains greenhood
- Pterostylis saxosa (D.L.Jones & C.J.French) D.L.Jones & C.J.French
- Pterostylis saxum (D.L.Jones & C.J.French) D.L.Jones & C.J.French
- Pterostylis scabra Lindl. – green-veined shell orchid
- Pterostylis scabrella (D.L.Jones & C.J.French) D.L.Jones & C.J.French
- Pterostylis scabrida Lindl. – rough greenhood
- Pterostylis scapula (D.L.Jones) D.L.Jones
- Pterostylis scitula D.L.Jones & C.J.French – elegant snail orchid
- Pterostylis scoliosa D.L.Jones – small kinked greenhood
- Pterostylis setifera M.A.Clem. – bristly rustyhood, Sikh's whiskers,
- Pterostylis silvicultrix (F.Muell.) D.L.Jones & M.A.Clem. – Chatham Island greenhood, tutukiwi (N.Z.)
- Pterostylis sigmoidea (D.L.Jones & C.J.French) D.L.Jones & C.J.French
- Pterostylis silvicultrix (F.Muell.) D.L.Jones & M.A.Clem.
- Pterostylis simulans R.J.Bates
- Pterostylis sinuata (D.L.Jones) Janes & Duretto – Northampton midget greenhood, western swan greenhood
- Pterostylis smaragdyna D.L.Jones & M.A.Clem. – emerald-lip leafy greenhood
- Pterostylis spatalium J.M.H.Shaw
- Pterostylis spathulata M.A.Clem. – spoon-lipped rufous greenhood, Moora rustyhood
- Pterostylis spissa (D.L.Jones) G.N.Backh. – cygnet greenhood
- Pterostylis splendens D.L.Jones & M.A.Clem. (New Caledonia)
- Pterostylis squamata R.Br. – southern rustyhood, ruddyhood
- Pterostylis stenochila D.L.Jones – narrow-lip leafy greenhood
- Pterostylis stenosepala (D.L.Jones) G.N.Backh. – narrow-sepalled leafy greenhood
- Pterostylis striata Fitzg. – mainland striped greenhood
- Pterostylis stricta Clemesha & B.Gray – northern greenhood
- Pterostylis subtilis D.L.Jones – thin mountain greenhood
- Pterostylis tanypoda D.L.Jones, Molloy & M.A.Clem. – swan greenhood (N.Z.)
- Pterostylis tasmanica D.L.Jones – small bearded greenhood
- Pterostylis taurus M.A.Clem. & D.L.Jones – little bull orchid
- Pterostylis telmata D.L.Jones & C.J.French
- Pterostylis tenuicauda Kraenzl. (New Caledonia)
- Pterostylis tenuis (D.L.Jones) G.N.Backh. – smooth leafy greenhood
- Pterostylis tenuissima Nicholls – swamp greenhood
- Pterostylis terminalis {D.L.Jones & R.J.Bates) J.M.H.Shaw
- Pterostylis thulia (D.L.Jones) Janes & Duretto
- Pterostylis timorensis Schuit. & J.J.Verm. (East Timor)
- Pterostylis timothyi (D.L.Jones) Janes & Duretto – brittle snail orchid, fawn snail orchid
- Pterostylis torquata D.L.Jones – collared greenhood
- Pterostylis × toveyana Ewart & Sharman
- Pterostylis tristis Colenso – midget greenhood (N.Z.)
- Pterostylis trullifolia Hook.f. – trowel-leaved greenhood (N.Z.)
- Pterostylis truncata Fitzg. – brittle greenhood, little dumpies
- Pterostylis tryphera (D.L.Jones & C.J.French) D.L.Jones & C.J.French
- Pterostylis tunstallii D.L.Jones & M.A.Clem. – Tunstall's greenhood, granite greenhood
- Pterostylis turfosa Endl. – bearded bird orchid
- Pterostylis tylosa (D.L.Jones & C.J.French) D.L.Jones & C.J.French
- Pterostylis uliginosa D.L.Jones – marsh greenhood
- Pterostylis umbrina (D.L.Jones) G.N.Backh. – broad-sepaled leafy greenhood
- Pterostylis unicornis (D.L.Jones) D.L.Jones
- Pterostylis valida (Nicholls) D.L.Jones
- Pterostylis venosa Colenso (N.Z.)
- Pterostylis ventricosa (D.L.Jones) G.N.Backh.
- Pterostylis venusta (D.L.Jones) D.L.Jones
- Pterostylis vernalis (D.L.Jones) G.N.Backh. – spring tiny greenhood
- Pterostylis vescula (D.L.Jones) D.L.Jones
- Pterostylis virens (D.L.Jones & C.J.French) D.L.Jones & C.J.French
- Pterostylis viriosa (D.L.Jones) R.J.Bates – Adelaide Hills banded greenhood
- Pterostylis vitrea (D.L.Jones) Bostock – glassy leafy greenhood
- Pterostylis vittata Lindl. – banded greenhood, green-banded greenhood
- Pterostylis voigtii D.L.Jones & C.J.French
- Pterostylis wapstrarum D.L.Jones – fleshy greenhood
- Pterostylis williamsonii D.L.Jones – brown-lip leafy greenhood
- Pterostylis woollsii Fitzg. – long-tailed greenhood
- Pterostylis xerampelina (D.L.Jones & C.J.French) D.L.Jones & C.J.French
- Pterostylis xerophila M.A.Clem. – desert rustyhood, desert greenhood
- Pterostylis zebrina (D.L.Jones & C.J.French) D.L.Jones
- Pterostylis ziegeleri D.L.Jones – Cape Portland greenhood
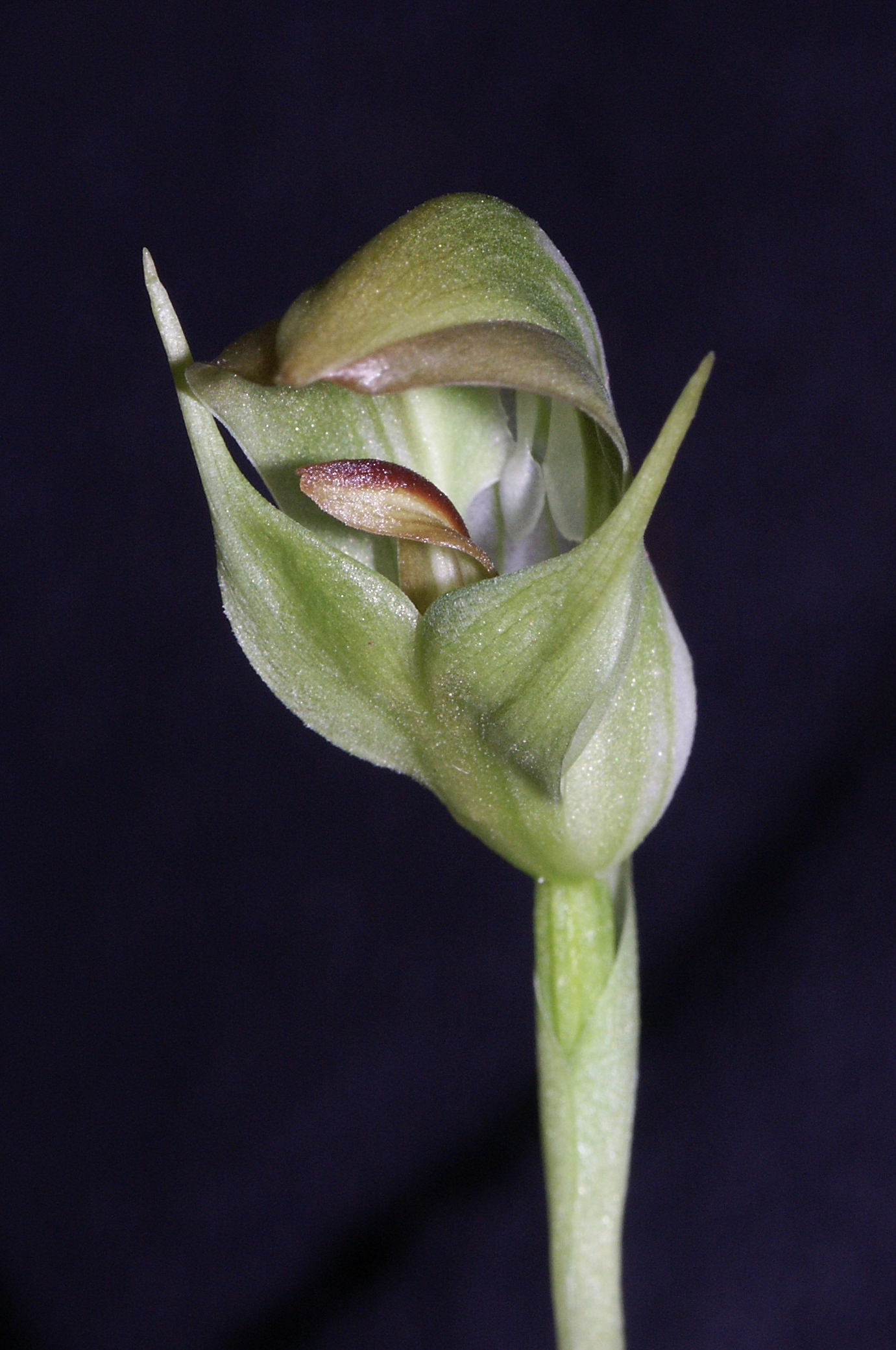
Pterostylis curta

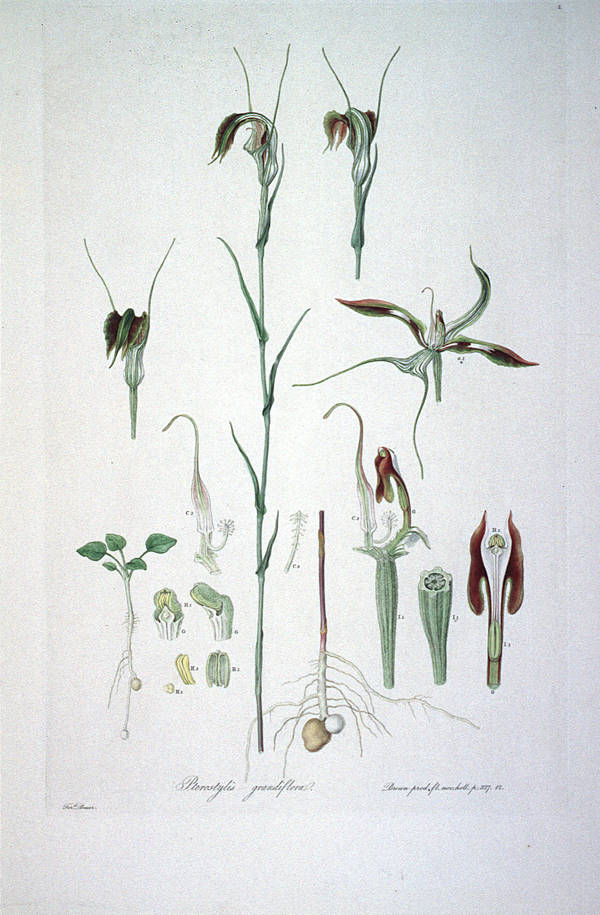
Pterostylis grandiflora

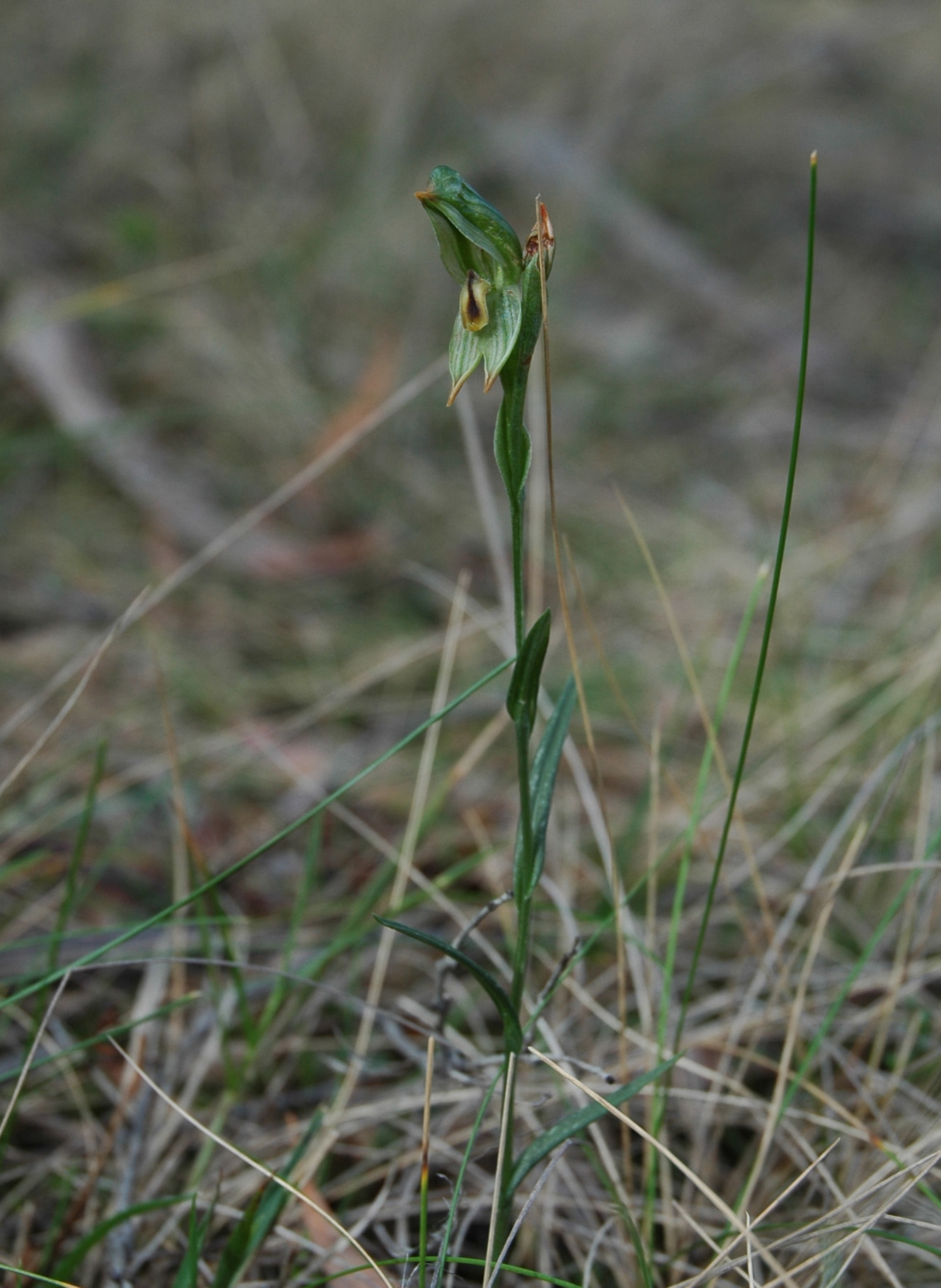
Pterostylis melagramma

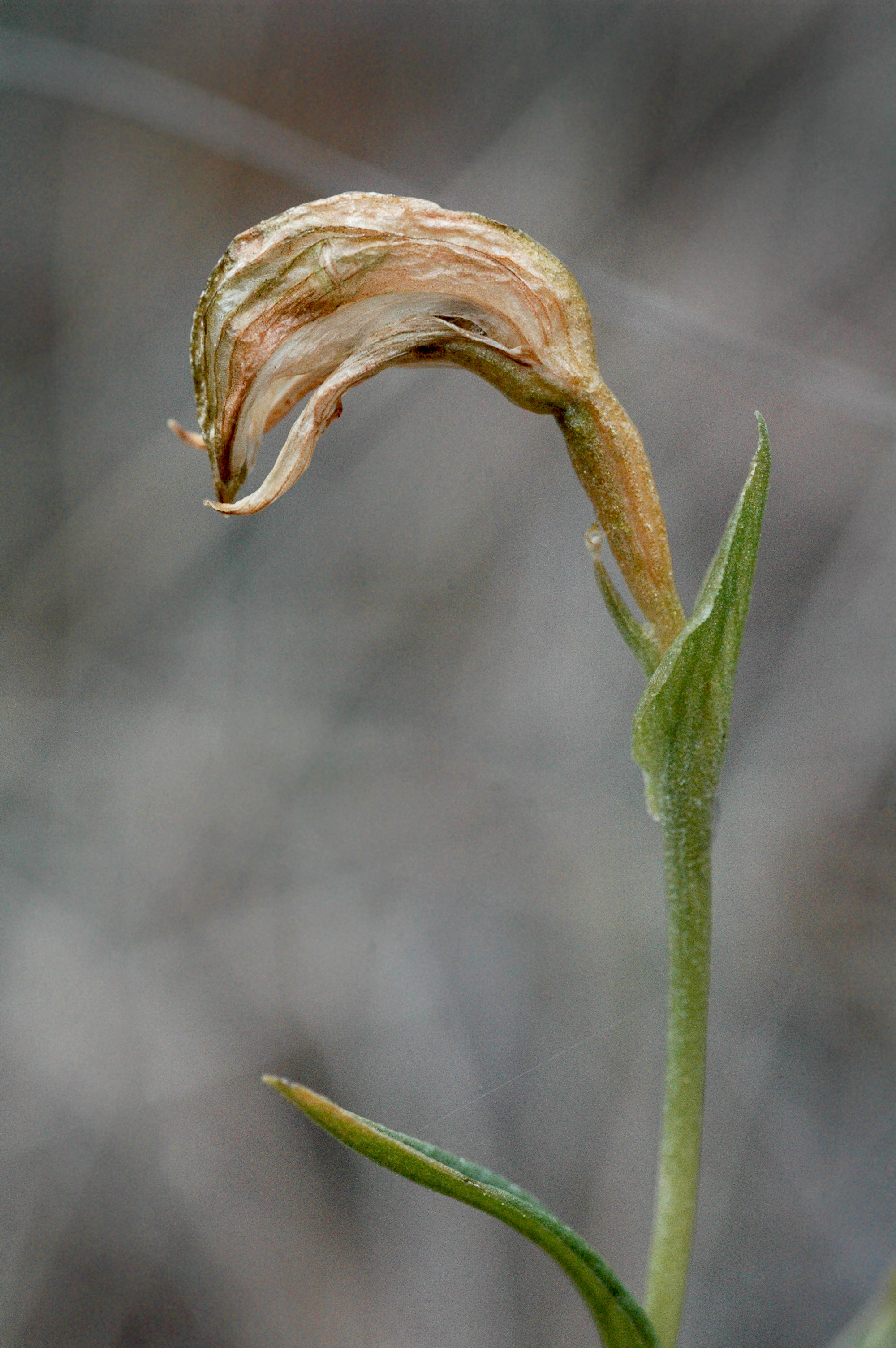
Pterostylis stenochila
setting seeds

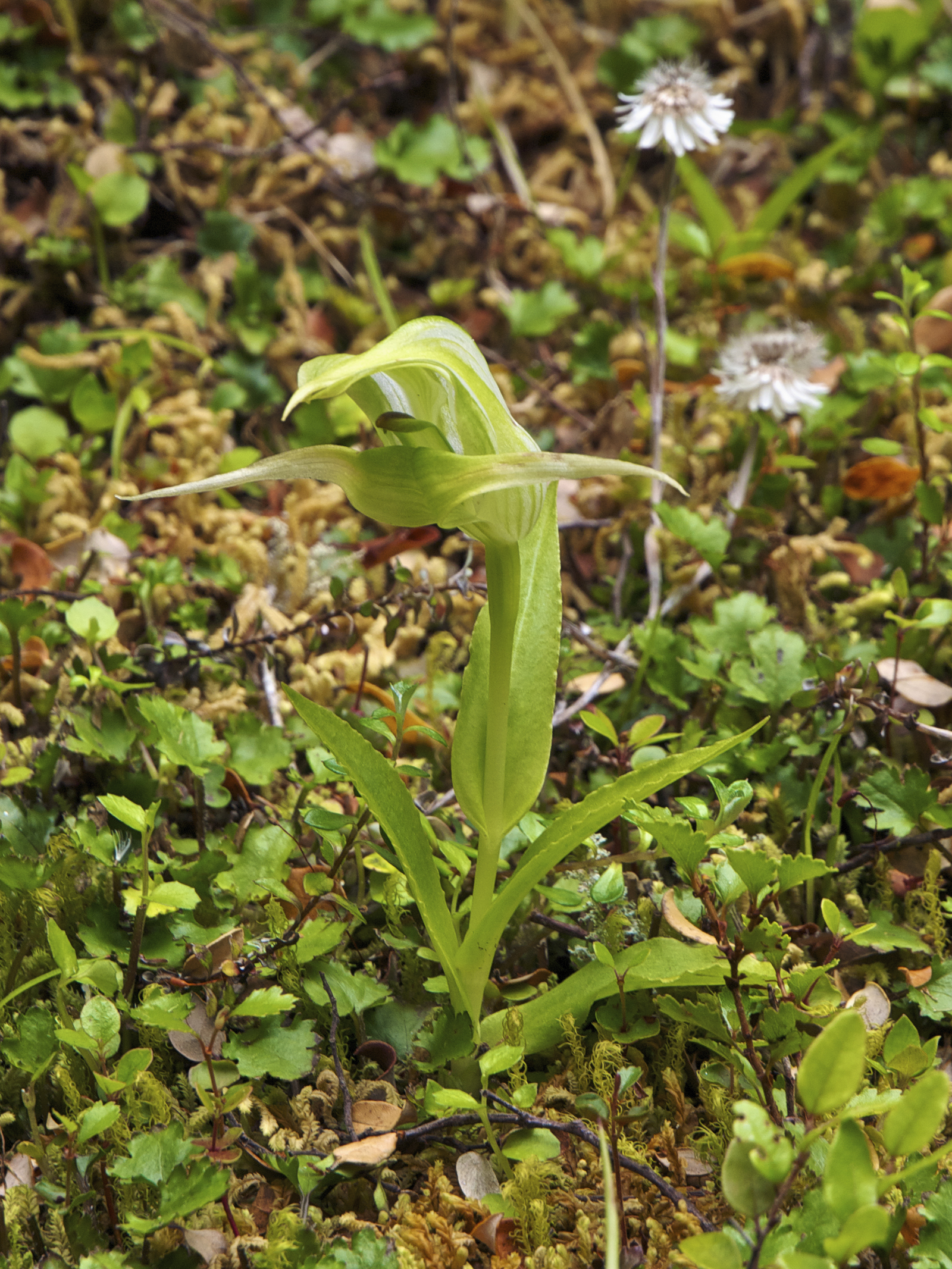
Pterostylis "Bluff" (unnamed species from N.Z.)

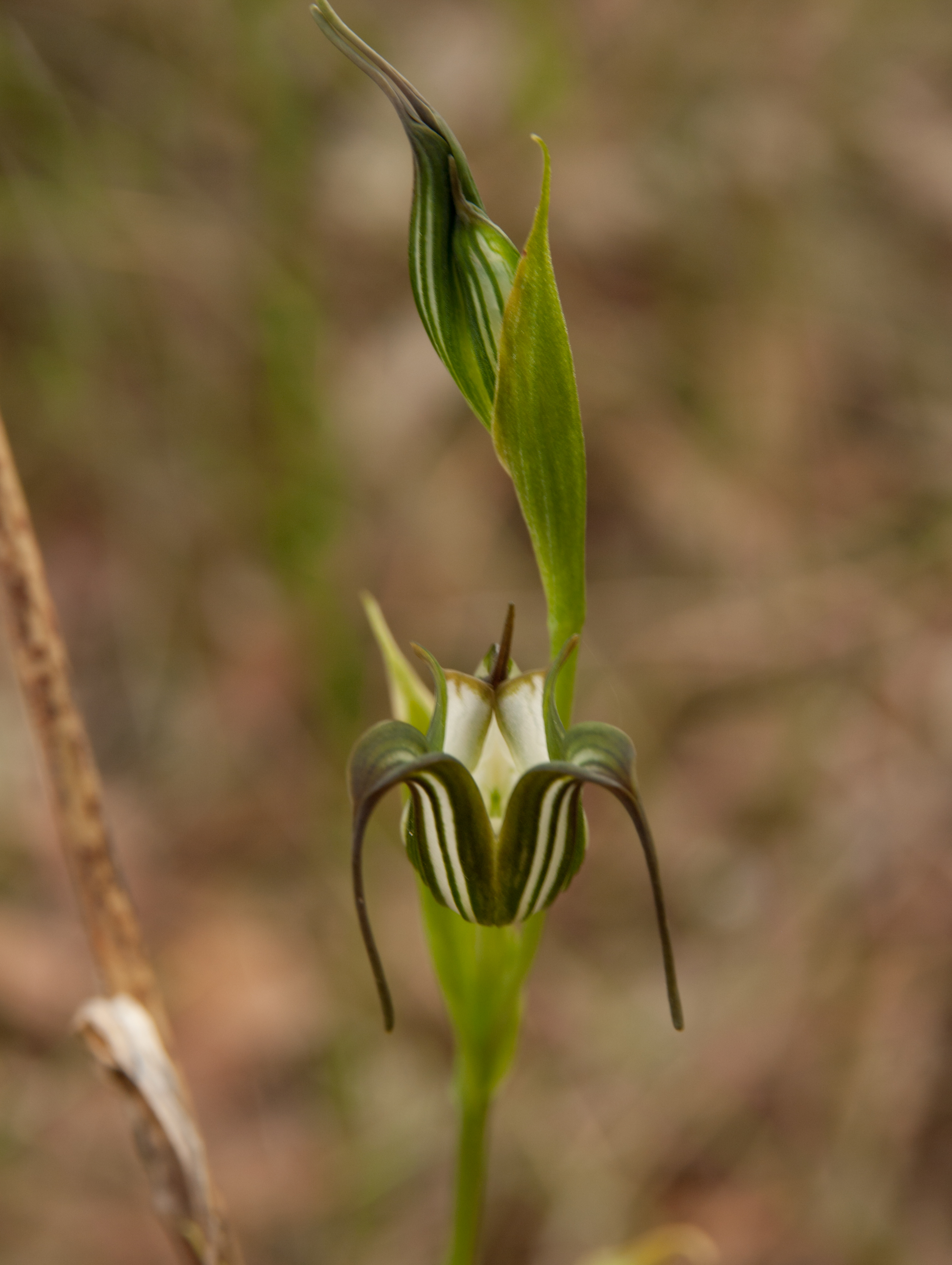
Pterostylis recurva
Jug orchid

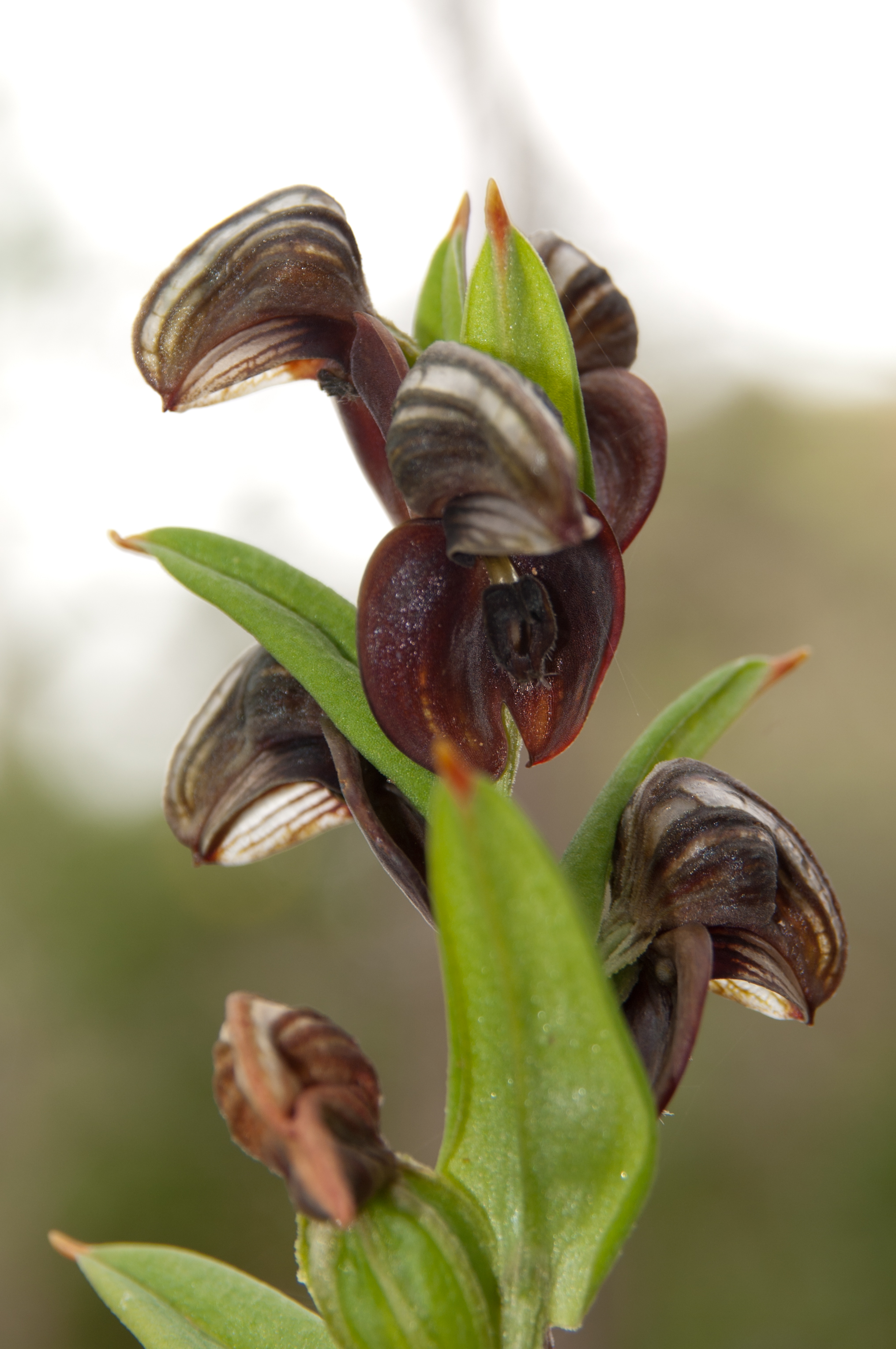
Pterostylis sanguinea
Dark banded greenhood

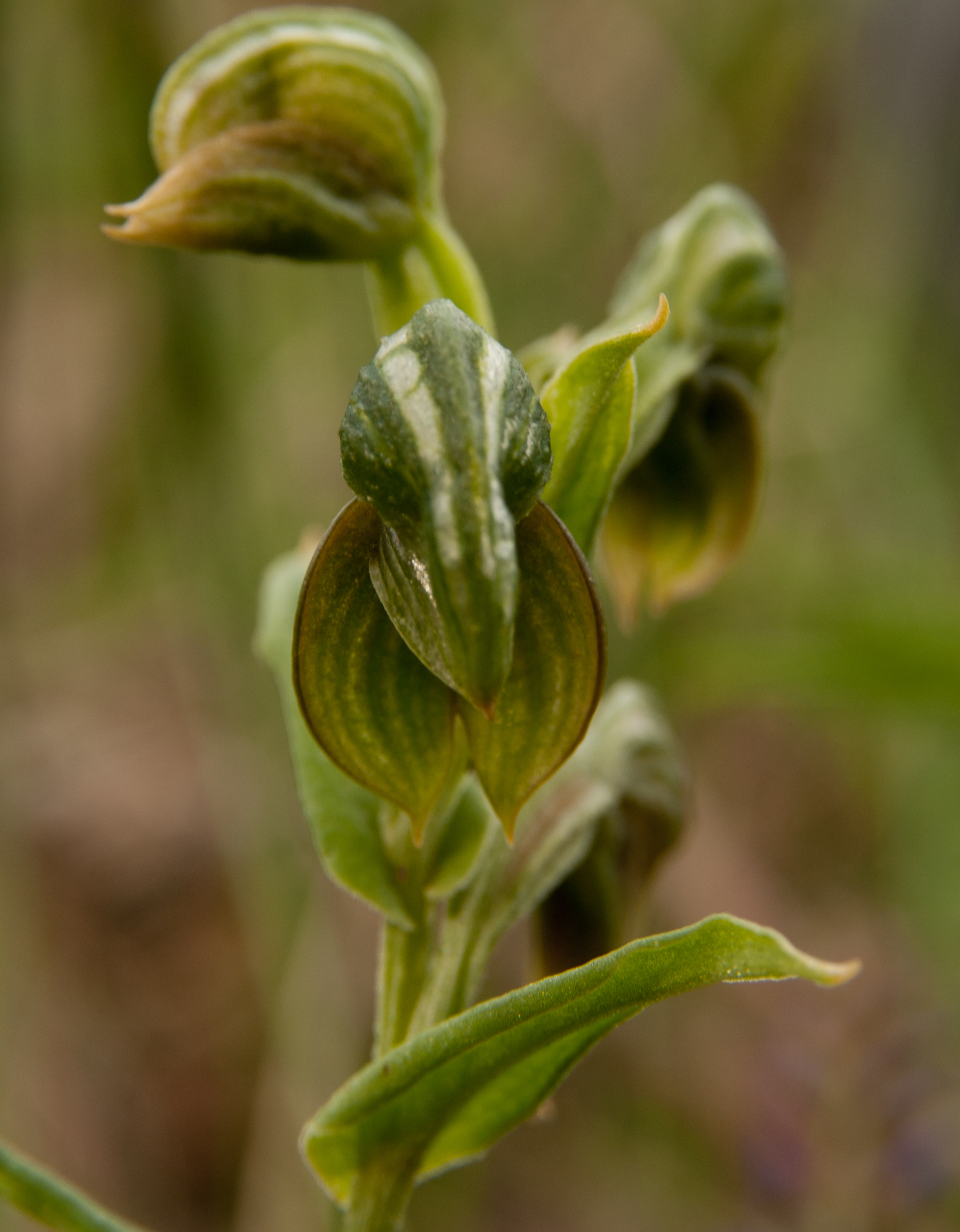
Pterostylis vittata
Banded greenhood
