= Pterostylis exalla =

Scientific classification
- Kingdom: Plantae
- Clade: Tracheophytes
- Clade: Angiosperms
- Clade: Monocots
- Order: Asparagales
- Family: Orchidaceae
- Subfamily: Orchidoideae
- Tribe: Cranichideae
- Genus: Pterostylis
- Species: P. exalla

Binomial name
- Pterostylis exalla (D.L.Jones) G.N.Backh.

Synonyms
- Oligochaetochilus exallus D.L.Jones

Species of orchid

Pterostylis exalla is a plant in the orchid family Orchidaceae and is endemic to South Australia. It was first formally described in 2009 by David Jones and given the name Oligochaetochilus exallus. The description was published in the journal The Victorian Naturalist from a specimen collected on the Wombat Plains in the Southern Lofty region. In 2010, Gary Backhouse changed the name to Pterostylis exalla. The specific epithet (exalla) is derived from the Ancient Greek word exallos meaning "quite different".
