= Pterostylis furcata =

Forked greenhood

Scientific classification
- Kingdom: Plantae
- Clade: Tracheophytes
- Clade: Angiosperms
- Clade: Monocots
- Order: Asparagales
- Family: Orchidaceae
- Subfamily: Orchidoideae
- Tribe: Cranichideae
- Genus: Pterostylis
- Species: P. furcata

Binomial name
- Pterostylis furcata Lindl.

Species of orchid

Pterostylis furcata, commonly known as the forked greenhood, is a species of orchid endemic to Tasmania. Flowering plants have a rosette of bright green leaves at the base of the flowering stem and a single green and white flower with the tip of the dorsal sepal pointing above the horizontal.

== Description ==
Pterostylis furcata is a terrestrial, perennial, deciduous, herb with an underground tuber. Flowering plants have a rosette of bright green leaves loosely arranged around the base of the flowering stem, each leaf 30–80 mm (1–3 in) long and 10–20 mm (0.4–0.8 in) wide. A single green and white flower 35–40 mm (1–2 in) long and 16–20 mm (0.6–0.8 in) wide is borne on a spike 120–200 mm (5–8 in) high. The dorsal sepal and petals are fused, forming a hood or "galea" over the column but the dorsal sepal is longer than the petals, has a sharp point on its end and points slightly upwards. There is a wide gap between the lateral sepals and the galea, and there is a curved, deeply notched sinus between them. The labellum is 18–22 mm (0.7–0.9 in) long, about 3 mm (0.1 in) wide, dark-coloured, curved and protrudes above the sinus. Flowering occurs from November to February.

== Taxonomy and naming ==
Pterostylis furcata was first formally described in 1840 by John Lindley from a specimen collected in Tasmania and the description was published in The Genera and Species of Orchidaceous Plants. The specific epithet (furcata) is a Latin word meaning "forked".

== Distribution and habitat ==
The forked greenhood grows in wet forest and in montane grassland in Tasmania.
