= Pterostylis incognita =

Sale greenhood

Scientific classification
- Kingdom: Plantae
- Clade: Tracheophytes
- Clade: Angiosperms
- Clade: Monocots
- Order: Asparagales
- Family: Orchidaceae
- Subfamily: Orchidoideae
- Tribe: Cranichideae
- Genus: Pterostylis
- Species: P. incognita

Binomial name
- Pterostylis incognita (D.L.Jones) G.N.Backh.

Synonyms
- Hymenochilus incognitus D.L.Jones

Species of orchid

Pterostylis incognita, commonly known as Sale greenhood, is a plant in the orchid family Orchidaceae and is endemic to Victoria. It has a rosette of leaves and when flowering, up to twelve crowded flowers on a stem with a rosette at the base. The type specimen was collected near Sale in 1895 but was not formally described or given a name until 2009, by which time it was presumed extinct.

== Description ==
Pterostylis incognita, is a terrestrial, perennial, deciduous, herb with an underground tuber. There is a rosette of between five and seven, egg-shaped leaves, each leaf 8–20 mm (0.3–0.8 in) long and 4–11 mm (0.2–0.4 in) wide at the base of the plant. Between five and twelve flowers are crowded together on a flowering spike 80–130 mm (3–5 in) high with three to five stem leaves wrapped around it. The flowers are 8–12 mm (0.3–0.5 in) long and the dorsal sepal and petals are joined to form a hood called the "galea" over the column. The galea is erect near its base then gradually curves with the tip suddenly turning downwards. The lateral sepals turn downwards and are about 4–5 mm (0.16–0.20 in) long, 5–6 mm (0.20–0.24 in) wide, cupped and joined for part of their length before ending in narrow tips about 3 mm (0.1 in) long. The labellum is about 2 mm (0.08 in) long and wide and green with a dark green appendage near its base. Flowering occurs from September to October.

== Taxonomy and naming ==
Sale greenhood was first formally described in 2009 by David Jones and given the name Hymenochilus incognitus from a specimen collected near Sale in 1895 by Miss M. Wise. The description was published in The Orchadian. In 2010 Gary Backhouse changed the name to Pterosylis incognita. The specific epithet (incognita) is a Latin word meaning "unknown".

== Distribution and habitat ==
Pterostylis incognita probably grew in grassland or in grassy forest near Sale.

== Conservation ==
No scientific collections of this species have been made for more than one hundred years and it is presumed to be extinct.
