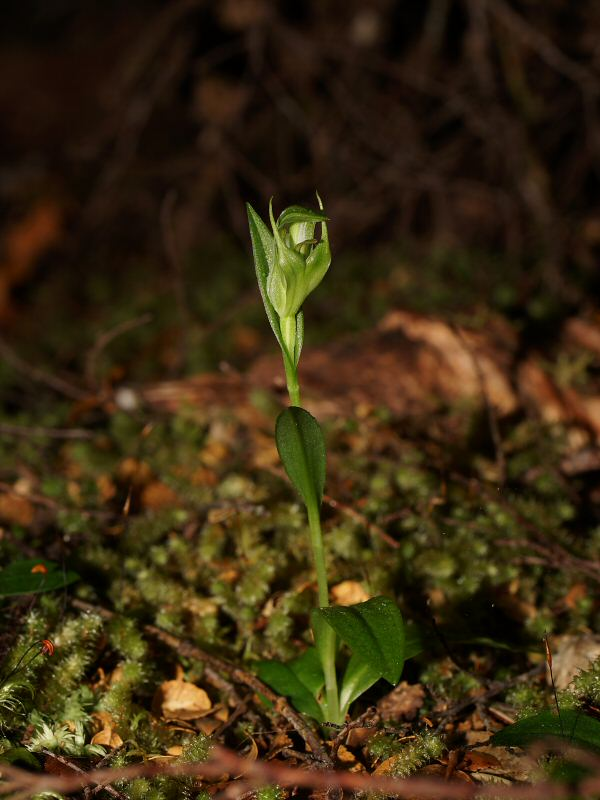
- Pterostylis scabrida growing near the Rapid River in Tasmania

Scientific classification
- Kingdom: Plantae
- Clade: Tracheophytes
- Clade: Angiosperms
- Clade: Monocots
- Order: Asparagales
- Family: Orchidaceae
- Subfamily: Orchidoideae
- Tribe: Cranichideae
- Genus: Pterostylis
- Species: P. scabrida

Binomial name
- Pterostylis scabrida Lindl.

= Pterostylis scabrida =

Rough greenhood

Species of orchid

Pterostylis scabrida, commonly known as the rough greenhood, is a species of orchid endemic to Tasmania. It has a rosette of leaves at the base of the plant and a single green and white flower on a rough stem. It is widespread and common in wet forests and is one of the few species of Pterostylis to grow in rainforest.

== Description ==
Pterostylis scabrida is a terrestrial, perennial, deciduous, herb with an underground tuber and a rosette of dark green leaves loosely surrounding the base of the flowering stem. Each leaf is 30–60 mm long and 8–10 mm wide. A single green and white flower 20–25 mm long and 14–16 mm wide is borne on a rough flowering stem 80–250 mm high. The dorsal sepal and petals are fused, forming a hood or "galea" over the column. The dorsal sepal is the same length as the petals and curves forward with a pointed tip. There is a wide gap between the galea and the lateral sepals. The lateral sepals are erect and have thread-like tips 14–16 mm long and a slightly bulging, V-shaped notch sinus between them. The labellum is 12–15 mm long, about 3 mm wide, brown and curved and protrudes above the sinus. Flowering occurs from October to February.

== Taxonomy and naming ==
Pterostylis scabrida was first formally described in 1840 by John Lindley and the description was published in his book, The Genera and Species of Orchidaceous Plants. The specific epithet (scabrida) is a Latin word meaning "rough" or "rugged".

== Distribution and habitat ==
The rough greenhood is widespread and common in wet forests, including rainforest, throughout Tasmania.
