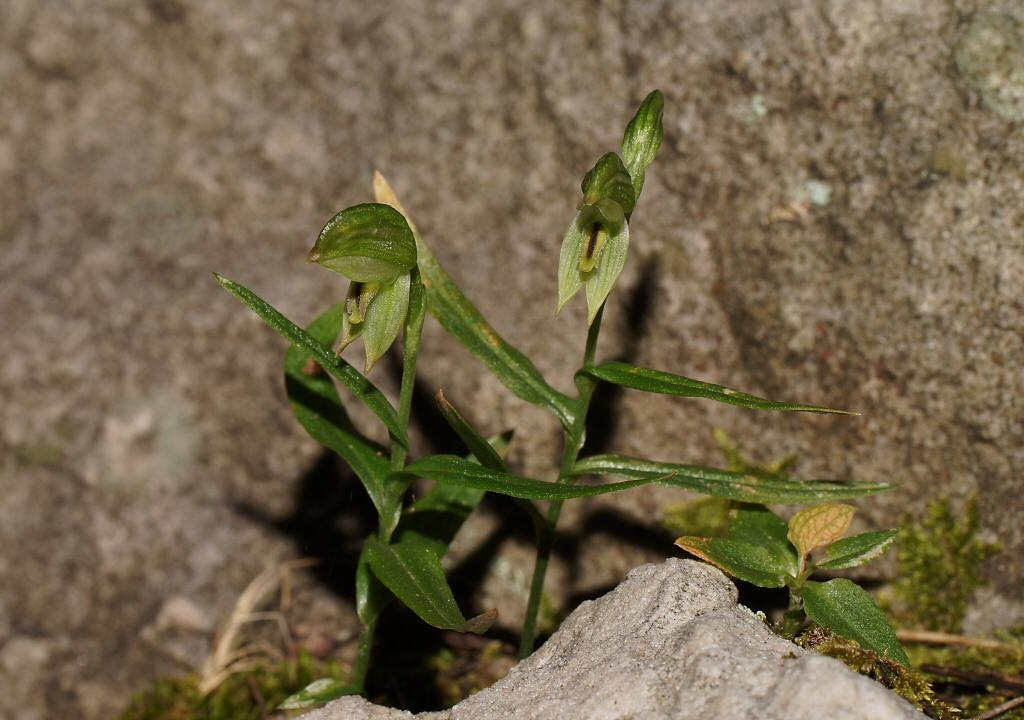
- Pterostylis macilenta growing in Grampians National Park

Scientific classification
- Kingdom: Plantae
- Clade: Tracheophytes
- Clade: Angiosperms
- Clade: Monocots
- Order: Asparagales
- Family: Orchidaceae
- Subfamily: Orchidoideae
- Tribe: Cranichideae
- Genus: Pterostylis
- Species: P. macilenta

Binomial name
- Pterostylis macilenta (D.L.Jones) G.N.Backh.

Synonyms
- Bunochilus macilentus D.L.Jones

= Pterostylis macilenta =

Species of orchid

Pterostylis macilenta is a plant in the orchid family Orchidaceae and is endemic to the Grampians National Park in Victoria. As with similar greenhoods, flowering plants differ from those that are not flowering. The non-flowering plants have a rosette of leaves flat on the ground but the flowering plants have up to six translucent, dark green flowers and lack a rosette.

== Description ==
Pterostylis macilenta, is a terrestrial, perennial, deciduous, herb with an underground tuber. Non-flowering plants have a rosette of between three and six, egg-shaped to lance-shaped leaves, each leaf 10–35 mm (0.4–1 in) long and 3–7 mm (0.1–0.3 in) wide. Flowering plants lack a rosette but have up to six flowers on a flowering spike 150–350 mm (6–10 in) high with five or six linear to narrow lance-shaped stem leaves that are 25–80 mm (1–3 in) long and 3–10 mm (0.1–0.4 in) wide. The flowers are 16–20 mm (0.6–0.8 in) long and the dorsal sepal and petals are joined to form a hood called the "galea" over the column. The galea is translucent dark green with darker green stripes. The lateral sepals turn downwards and are 10–15 mm (0.4–0.6 in) long, 7–9 mm (0.28–0.35 in) wide and joined for more than half their length. The labellum is 5–7 mm (0.2–0.3 in) long, about 2 mm (0.08 in) wide and yellowish to brown with a dark stripe along its mid-line. Flowering occurs from September to December.

== Taxonomy and naming ==
This greenhood was first formally described in 2006 by David Jones and given the name Bunochilus macilentus. The description was published in Australian Orchid Research from a specimen collected on Mount William in the Grampians National Park. In 2007, Gary Backhouse changed the name to Pterostylis macilenta. The specific epithet (macilenta) is derived from a Latin word meaning "lean", "thin" or "poor", referring to the narrow labellum.

== Distribution and habitat ==
Pterostylis macilenta is only known from the Grampians National Park where it grows with shrubs in moist forest.
