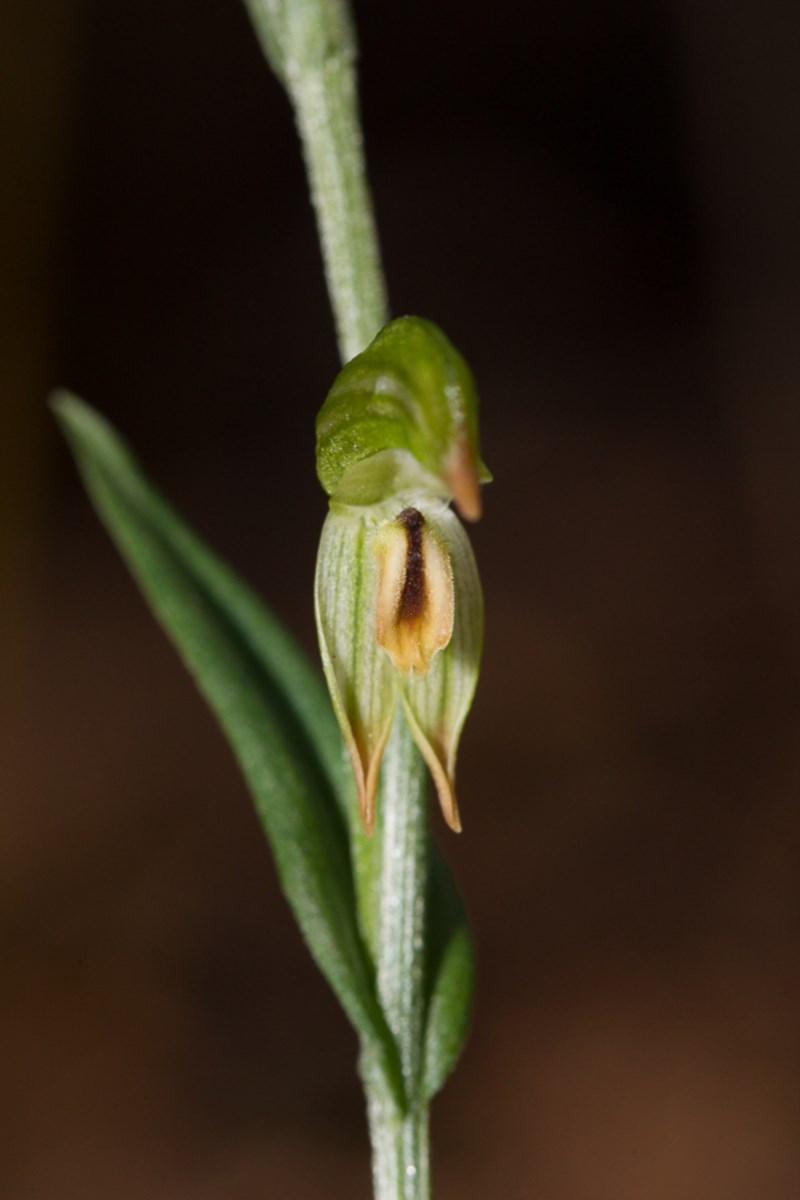
- Near the Cotter River

Scientific classification
- Kingdom: Plantae
- Clade: Tracheophytes
- Clade: Angiosperms
- Clade: Monocots
- Order: Asparagales
- Family: Orchidaceae
- Subfamily: Orchidoideae
- Tribe: Cranichideae
- Genus: Pterostylis
- Species: P. jonesii

Binomial name
- Pterostylis jonesii (D.L.Jones) Backh.

Synonyms
- Bunochilus montanus D.L.Jones

= Pterostylis jonesii =

Montane leafy greenhood

Species of orchid

Pterostylis jonesii, commonly known as montane leafy greenhood, is a plant in the orchid family Orchidaceae and is endemic to a small area of south-eastern Australia. Individual plants have either a rosette of three to six leaves or a flowering spike with up to eleven flowers and five to seven stem leaves. The flowers are translucent green with faint darker green lines and have a brownish-yellow labellum with a dark stripe.

== Description ==
Pterostylis jonesii, is a terrestrial, perennial, deciduous, herb with an underground tuber. Non-flowering plants have a rosette of between three and six narrow egg-shaped leaves, each leaf 6–25 mm (0.2–1 in) long and 2–6 mm (0.08–0.2 in) wide. Flowering plants have up to twenty translucent green flowers with faint darker lines on a flowering spike 150–700 mm (6–30 in) high. The flowering spike has between five and seven stem leaves which are 10–70 mm (0.4–3 in) long and 3–5 mm (0.1–0.2 in) wide. The flowers are 13–16 mm (0.5–0.6 in) long and the dorsal sepal and petals are joined to form a hood over the column. The lateral sepals turn downwards and are 12–15 mm (0.5–0.6 in) long, 6–8 mm (0.2–0.3 in) wide and joined to each other for about half their length then taper to orange-brown tips. The labellum is about 6 mm (0.2 in) long, 2 mm (0.08 in) wide, brownish-yellow, covered with hair-like cells and with a dark stripe along its mid-line. Flowering occurs from August to November.

== Taxonomy and naming ==
This greenhood was first formally described in 2006 by David Jones who gave it the name Bunochilus montanus and published the description in Australian Orchid Research. In 2007 Gary Backhouse changed the name to Pterostylis jonesii, rather than Pterostylis montana because that name was already in use for a New Zealand endemic. The specific epithet (jonesii) honours David Jones who published the original description.

== Distribution and habitat ==
Montane leafy greenhood is only known from forest in the higher areas of north-eastern Victoria and southern New South Wales.
