= Pterostylis tanypoda =

Swan greenhood

Scientific classification
- Kingdom: Plantae
- Clade: Tracheophytes
- Clade: Angiosperms
- Clade: Monocots
- Order: Asparagales
- Family: Orchidaceae
- Subfamily: Orchidoideae
- Tribe: Cranichideae
- Genus: Pterostylis
- Species: P. tanypoda

Binomial name
- Pterostylis tanypoda D.L.Jones, Molloy & M.A.Clem.

Synonyms
- Hymenochilus tanypodus (D.L.Jones, Molloy & M.A.Clem.) D.L.Jones, M.A.Clem. & Molloy

Species of orchid

Pterostylis tanypoda, commonly known as the swan greenhood, is a species of greenhood orchid endemic to New Zealand. Both flowering and non-flowering plants have a rosette of leaves lying flat on the ground and flowering plants have up to seven crowded, inconspicuous bluish-green and white-striped flowers.

== Description ==
Pterostylis tanypoda is a terrestrial, perennial, deciduous, herb with an underground tuber. Non-flowering plants have a stalked rosette of bluish-green, egg-shaped leaves which are 5–15 mm (0.2–0.6 in) long and 5–12 mm (0.2–0.5 in) wide. Up to seven bluish-green and white-striped flowers are crowded together on a fleshy flowering stem 20–100 mm (0.8–4 in) high with many stem leaves similar to the rosette leaves but smaller. The dorsal sepal and petals are fused, forming a hood or "galea" over the column. The galea is 5–10 mm (0.2–0.4 in) long and wide with the dorsal sepal slightly longer than the petals. The lateral sepals are downturned and joined together. The labellum is short, broad and blunt with a dark green lobe on the upper end. Flowering occurs from October to January.

== Taxonomy and naming ==
Pterostylis tanypoda was first formally described in 1997 by David Jones, Brian Molloy and Mark Clements from a specimen collected near Castle Hill. The description was published in The Orchadian. The specific epithet (tanypoda) is derived from the Ancient Greek words tany- meaning "long" and pous meaning "foot".

== Distribution and habitat ==
This greenhood grows in montane and subalpine grassland on the eastern side of South Island between Marlborough and Southland.
