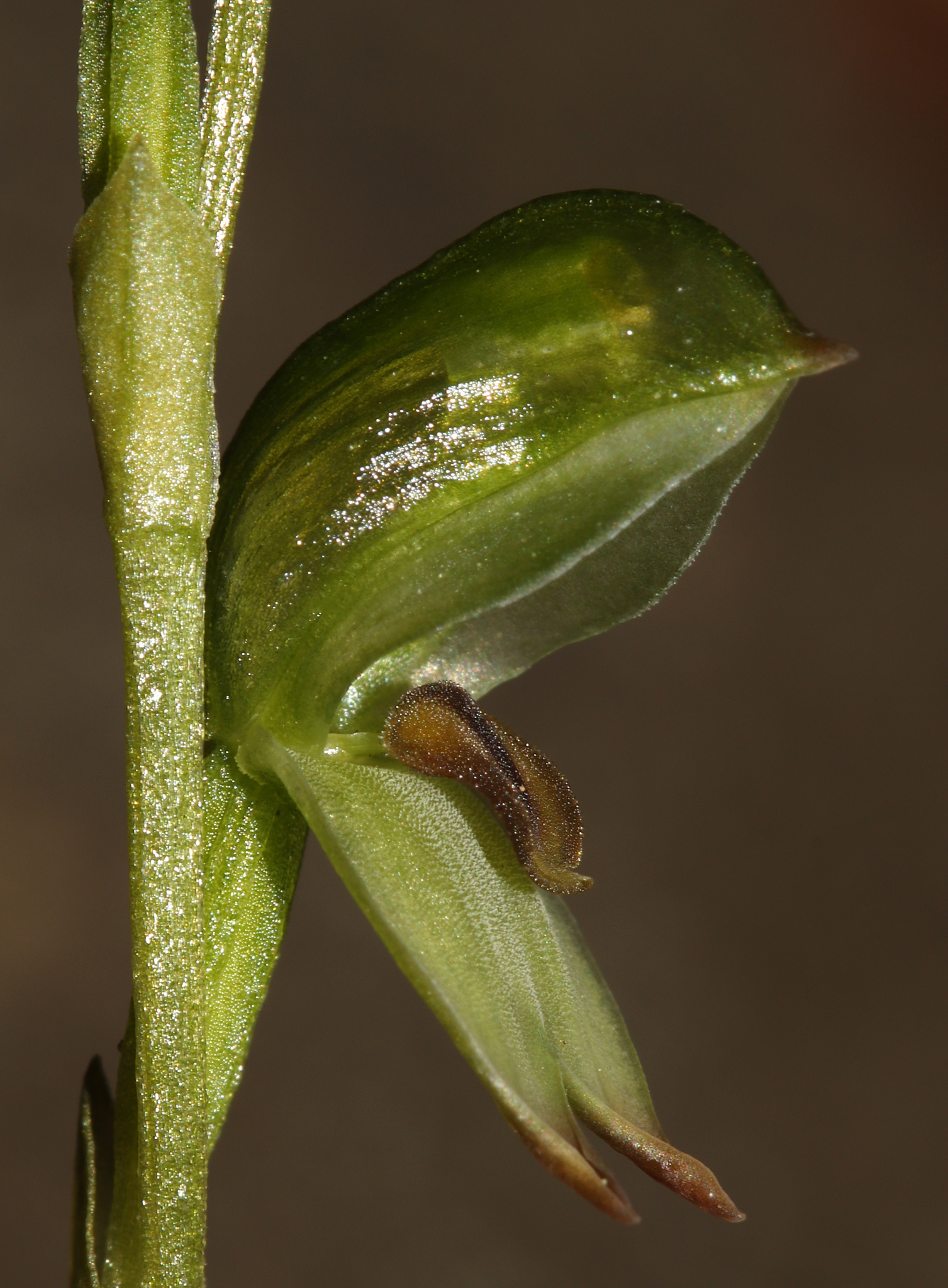

Scientific classification
- Kingdom: Plantae
- Clade: Tracheophytes
- Clade: Angiosperms
- Clade: Monocots
- Order: Asparagales
- Family: Orchidaceae
- Subfamily: Orchidoideae
- Tribe: Cranichideae
- Genus: Pterostylis
- Species: P. parca

Binomial name
- Pterostylis parca (D.L.Jones) G.N.Backh.

Synonyms
- Bunochilus parcus D.L.Jones

= Pterostylis parca =

Lithgow leafy greenhood

Species of orchid

Pterostylis parca commonly known as the Lithgow leafy greenhood is a plant in the orchid family Orchidaceae and is endemic to New South Wales. Non-flowering plants have a rosette of leaves on a short stalk. Flowering plants lack a rosette but have up to eight translucent pale green flowers on a flowering stem with three to six stem leaves.

== Description ==
Pterostylis parca, is a terrestrial, perennial, deciduous, herb with an underground tuber. Non-flowering plants have a rosette of between three and four narrow egg-shaped leaves, each leaf 10–30 mm (0.4–1 in) long and 3–5 mm (0.1–0.2 in) wide on a stalk 30–60 mm (1–2 in) high. Flowering plants have up to eight translucent pale green flowers on a flowering spike 150–450 mm (6–20 in) high. The flowering spike has between five and seven stem leaves which are 30–70 mm (1–3 in) long and 3–5 mm (0.1–0.2 in) wide. The flowers are 13–15 mm (0.5–0.6 in) long, 5–7 mm (0.2–0.3 in) wide. The dorsal sepal and petals are joined to form a hood over the column with the dorsal sepal having a brown tip. The lateral sepals turn downwards and are 10–12 mm (0.4–0.5 in) long, 5–7 mm (0.2–0.3 in) wide and joined to each other for more than half their length. The labellum is about 4 mm (0.2 in) long, 2 mm (0.08 in) wide, reddish-brown and hairy with a dark stripe along its mid-line. Flowering occurs from August to October.

== Taxonomy and naming ==
The Lithgow leafy greenhood was first formally described in 2006 by David Jones who gave it the name Bunochilus parcus and published the description in Australian Orchid Research from a specimen collected near Lithgow. In 2010, Gary Backhouse changed the name to Pterostylis parca. The specific epithet (parca) is a Latin word meaning "frugal", "scanty", "thrifty" or "penurious", referring to the small labellum of this species.

== Distribution and habitat ==
Pterostylis parca grows in moist places in forest in the Lithgow and Bathurst areas.
