= Pterostylis clivicola =

Scientific classification
- Kingdom: Plantae
- Clade: Tracheophytes
- Clade: Angiosperms
- Clade: Monocots
- Order: Asparagales
- Family: Orchidaceae
- Subfamily: Orchidoideae
- Tribe: Cranichideae
- Genus: Pterostylis
- Species: P. clivicola

Binomial name
- Pterostylis clivicola D.L.Jones G.N.Backhouse

Synonyms
- Hymenochilus clivicola D.L.Jones

Species of orchid

Pterostylis clivicola is a plant in the orchid family Orchidaceae and is endemic to a small area near the border between New South Wales and Victoria. It has a rosette of leaves and up to fourteen green flowers which have a labellum with a dark green, beak-like appendage.

== Description ==
Pterostylis clivicola, is a terrestrial, perennial, deciduous, herb with an underground tuber. It has a rosette of between five and eight egg-shaped leaves, each leaf 6–20 mm (0.2–0.8 in) long and 3–8 mm (0.1–0.3 in) wide. Flowering plants have the rosette at the base of a flowering stem 50–160 mm (2–6 in) high with between three and fourteen translucent green flowers with dark green lines. The dorsal sepal and petals form a hood or "galea" over the column. The dorsal sepal is pointed, erect near its base then curves forward. The lateral sepals turn downwards, joined for part of their length, the joined part 4–5 mm (0.16–0.20 in) long and 5–6 mm (0.20–0.24 in) wide. The labellum is green, about 2 mm (0.08 in) long wide with a greenish-black appendage with three ridges. Flowering occurs from October to December.

== Taxonomy and naming ==
This greenhood was first formally described in 2008 by David Jones and given the name Hymenochilus clivicola. The description was published in The Orchadian from a specimen collected near Delegate. In 2010, Gary Backhouse changed the name to Pterostylis clivicola. The specific epithet (clivicola) is derived from the Latin word clivus meaning "ascent", "elevation", "hill" or "sloping hillside" with the suffix -cola meaning "dweller".

== Distribution and habitat ==
Pterostylis clivicola is only known from a population of about twenty plants growing in grassland near Bendoc.
