= Pterostylis erubescens =

Red sepaled snail orchid

Scientific classification
- Kingdom: Plantae
- Clade: Tracheophytes
- Clade: Angiosperms
- Clade: Monocots
- Order: Asparagales
- Family: Orchidaceae
- Subfamily: Orchidoideae
- Tribe: Cranichideae
- Genus: Pterostylis
- Species: P. erubescens

Binomial name
- Pterostylis erubescens D.L.Jones & C.J.French

Synonyms
- Diplodium erubescens (D.L.Jones & C.J.French) D.L.Jones & M.A.Clem.

Species of orchid

Pterostylis erubescens, commonly known as red sepaled snail orchid, is a species of orchid endemic to the south-west of Western Australia. Non-flowering plants have a rosette of leaves flat on the ground but flowering plants lack a rosette and have a single large green flower which turns reddish-brown as it ages, and has leaves on the flowering spike.

== Description ==
Pterostylis erubescens is a terrestrial, perennial, deciduous, herb with an underground tuber and when not flowering, a rosette of leaves 15–25 mm (0.6–1 in) in diameter. Flowering plants have a single green flower 12–20 mm (0.5–0.8 in) long and 6–10 mm (0.2–0.4 in) wide on a flowering stem 60–200 mm (2–8 in) high. The flowers turn reddish-brown as they age. There are up to ten leaves 8–22 mm (0.3–0.9 in) long and 4–10 mm (0.16–0.39 in) wide on the flowering stem. The dorsal sepal and petals are fused, forming a hood or "galea" over the column, the dorsal sepal with a tapered tip and the petals broadly flared. The lateral sepals are held close to the galea, almost close off the front of the flower and have erect, thread-like tips 12–23 mm (0.5–0.9 in) long. The labellum is relatively large but not visible from outside the flower. Flowering occurs from late July to September.

== Taxonomy and naming ==
Pterostylis erubescens was first formally described in 2014 by David Jones and Christopher French from a specimen collected near Augusta and the description was published in Australian Orchid Review. The species had previously been known as Pterostylis sp. 'red flowered'. The specific epithet (erubescens) is a Latin word meaning "reddening" referring to the colour of the upper parts of the flowers of this species.

== Distribution and habitat ==
Red sepaled snail orchid grows in forest, woodland and around granite outcrops between Mandurah and Albany in the Esperance Plains, Jarrah Forest, Swan Coastal Plain and Warren biogeographic regions.

== Conservation ==
Pterostylis erubescens is listed as "not threatened" by the Government of Western Australia Department of Parks and Wildlife.
