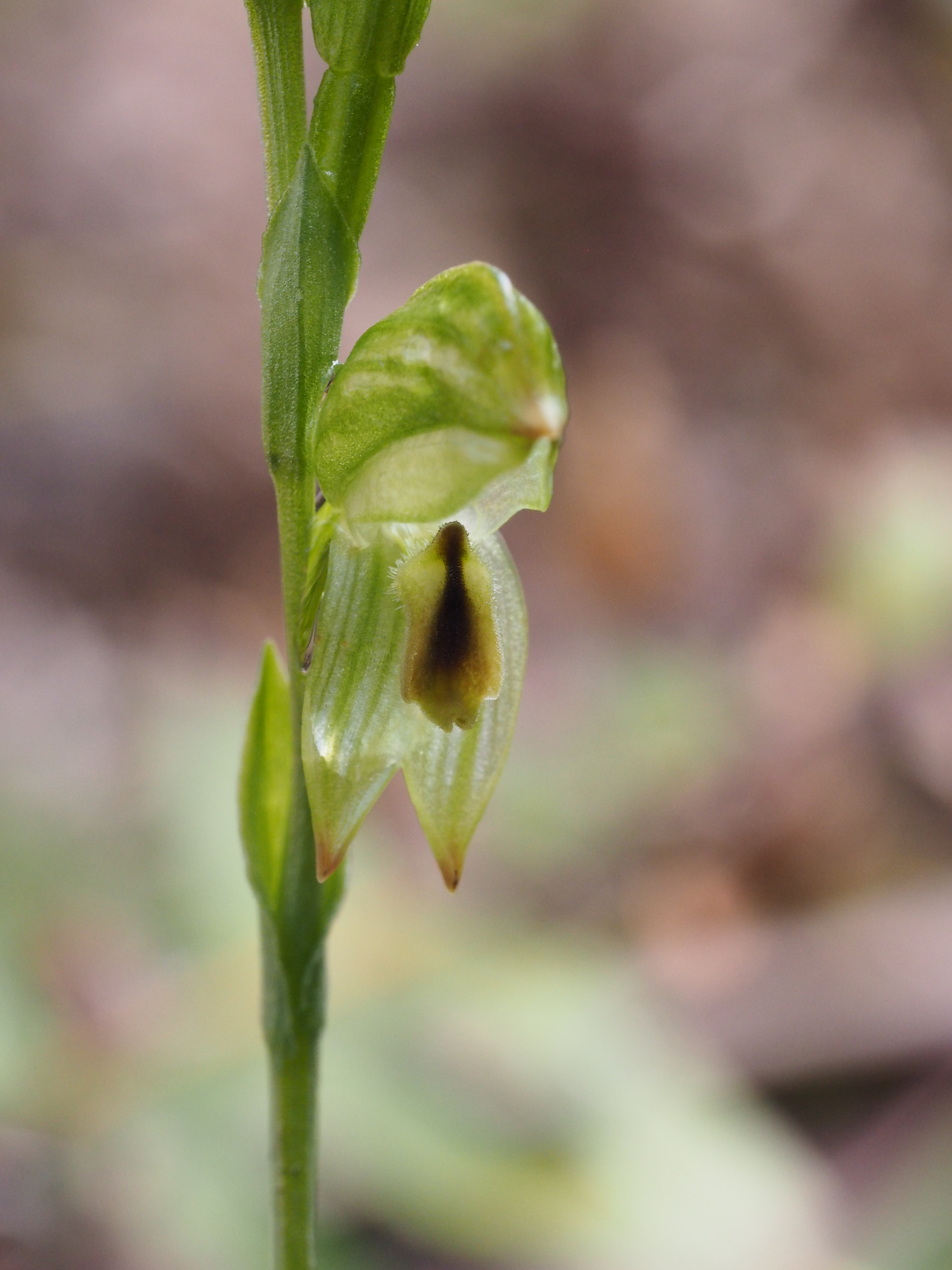
- In the Barrington Tops State Forest

Scientific classification
- Kingdom: Plantae
- Clade: Tracheophytes
- Clade: Angiosperms
- Clade: Monocots
- Order: Asparagales
- Family: Orchidaceae
- Subfamily: Orchidoideae
- Tribe: Cranichideae
- Genus: Pterostylis
- Species: P. barringtonensis

Binomial name
- Pterostylis barringtonensis (D.L.Jones) G.N.Backh.

Synonyms
- Bunochilus barringtonensis D.L.Jones

= Pterostylis barringtonensis =

Barrington leafy greenhood

Species of orchid

Pterostylis barringtonensis, commonly known as Barrington leafy greenhood, is a plant in the orchid family Orchidaceae and is endemic to New South Wales. As with similar greenhoods, the flowering plants differ from those which are not flowering. The non-flowering plants have a rosette of leaves on a short stalk but the flowering plants lack a rosette and have up to seven dark green flowers on a flowering stem with stem leaves. It is only known from Barrington Tops.

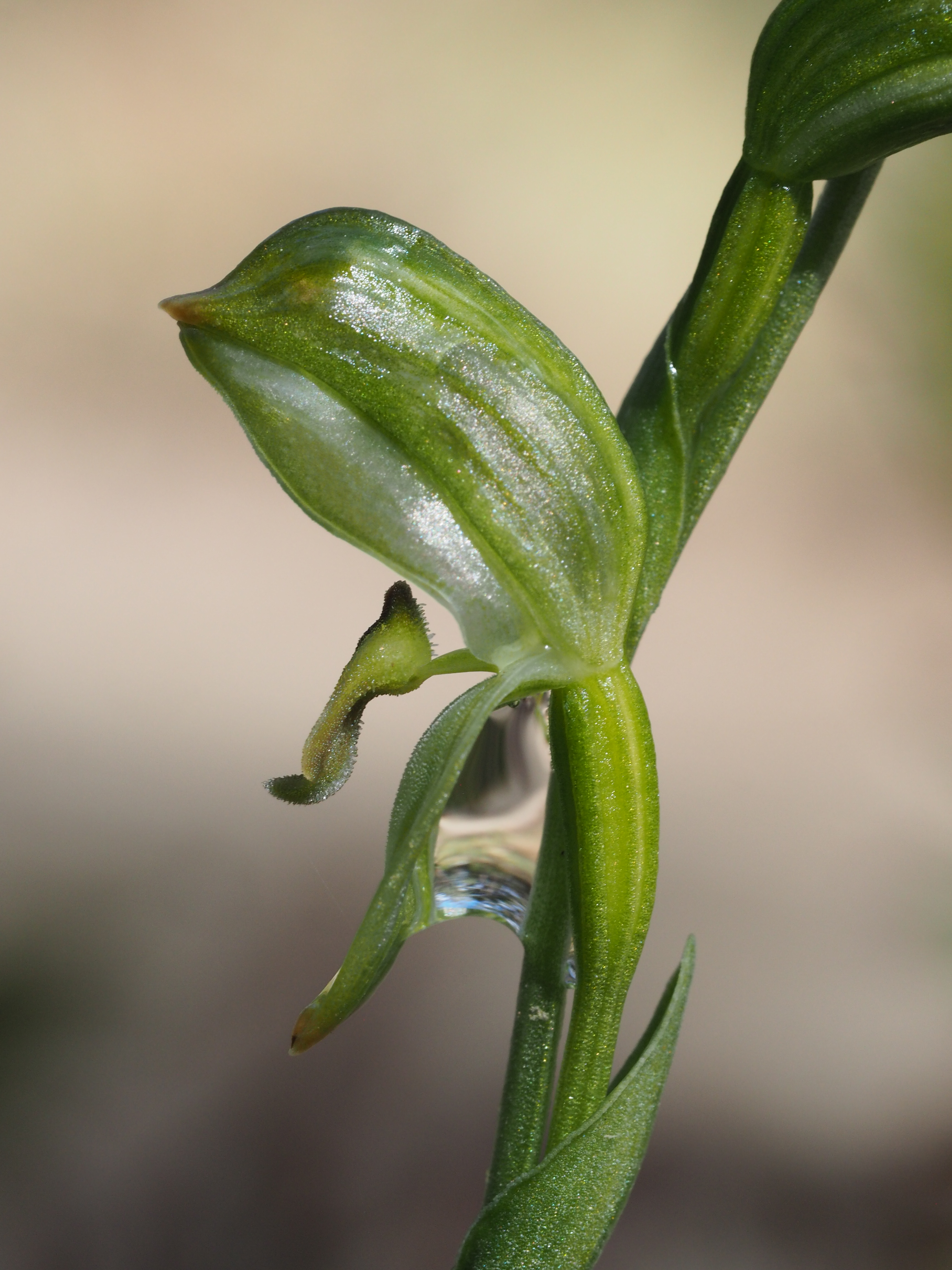
Side view of flower

== Description ==
Pterostylis barringtonensis, is a terrestrial, perennial, deciduous, herb with an underground tuber. Non-flowering plants have a rosette of between three and six leaves, each leaf 15–50 mm (0.6–2 in) long and 4–8 mm (0.2–0.3 in) wide on a stalk 30–60 mm (1–2 in) high. Flowering plants lack a rosette but have up to seven flowers on a flowering spike 200–300 mm (8–10 in) high with between five and seven linear stem leaves which are 30–65 mm (1–3 in) long and 3–6 mm (0.1–0.2 in) wide. The flowers are 14–18 mm (0.6–0.7 in) long, 4–6 mm (0.16–0.24 in) wide. The dorsal sepal and petals are joined to form a hood called the "galea" over the column. The galea is dark green with darker green lines and a brown, tapered tip. The lateral sepals turn downwards and are 11–13 mm (0.4–0.5 in) long, 6–8 mm (0.2–0.3 in) wide and joined for about half their length. The labellum is 6–7 mm (0.2–0.3 in) long, about 3 mm (0.1 in) wide and brown with a dark stripe along its mid-line. Flowering occurs from June to August.

== Taxonomy and naming ==
Barrington greenhood was first formally described in 2006 by David Jones who gave it the name Bunochilus barringtonensis. The description was published in Australian Orchid Research from a specimen collected in the Barrington Tops National Park. In 2010, Gary Backhouse changed the name to Pterostylis barringtonensis. The specific epithet (barringtonensis) refers to the area where this greenhood grows with the Latin suffix -ensis meaning "place for" or "where", referring to Barrington Tops.

== Distribution and habitat ==
Pterostylis barringtonensis occurs in moist places in tall forest in the Barrington Tops area.
