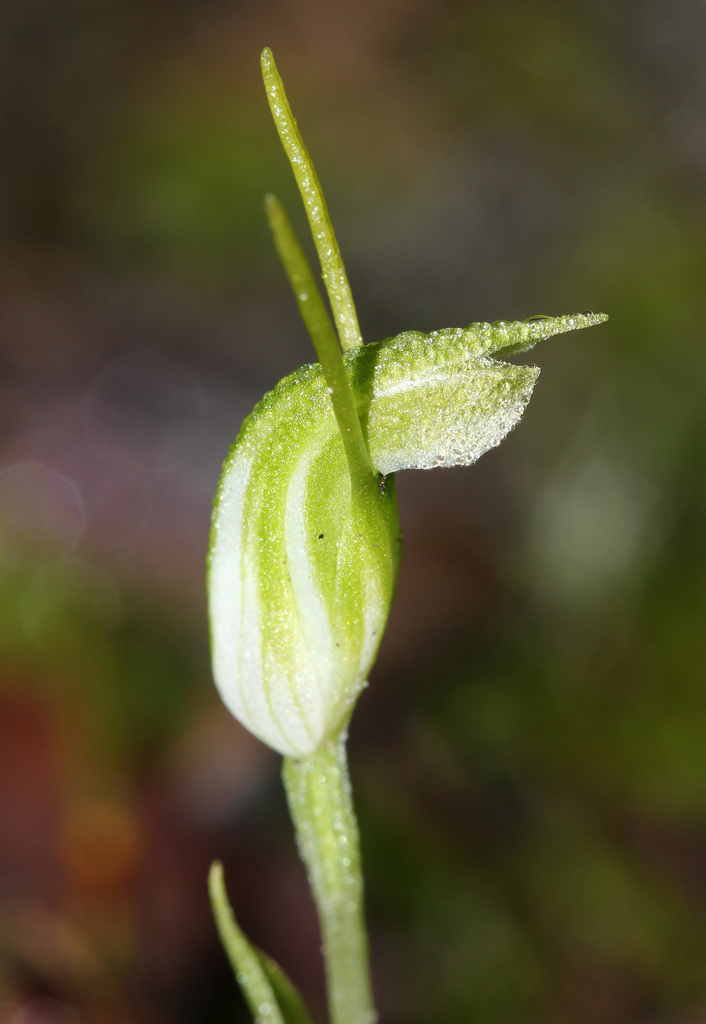

Scientific classification
- Kingdom: Plantae
- Clade: Tracheophytes
- Clade: Angiosperms
- Clade: Monocots
- Order: Asparagales
- Family: Orchidaceae
- Subfamily: Orchidoideae
- Tribe: Cranichideae
- Genus: Pterostylis
- Species: P. angulata

Binomial name
- Pterostylis angulata (D.L.Jones & C.J.French) D.L.Jones & C.J.French

Synonyms
- Diplodium angulatum D.L.Jones & C.J.French; Pterostylis aff. nana; Pterostylis angulata D.L.Jones & C.J.French nom. inval.; Pterostylis sp. 'Helena River'; Pterostylis sp. 'limestone'; Pterostylis sp. 'Helena River' (G.Brockman GBB 340) WA Herbarium; Pterostylis sp. 'limestone' (B.J.Keighery & G.J.Keighery 65)

= Pterostylis angulata =

Species of plant

Pterostylis angulata, commonly known as the Helena River snail orchid or limestone snail orchid, is a species of greenhood orchid endemic to south-western Australia.

== Description ==
Pterostylis angulata is a herbaceous terrestrial orchid with a basal rosette of 4-7 ovate leaves, dark blue-green in colour, each measuring 5–20 mm (0.20–0.79 in) long and 3–12 mm (0.12–0.47 in) wide. This rosette is present on both flowering and non-flowering plants. When flowering, this species produces a single flower on a stalk measuring 70–180 mm (2.8–7.1 in) tall with 3-5 stem leaves. The flowers are a translucent white with green stripes and markings, 17–22 mm (0.67–0.87 in) long. Flowering occurs from August to September.

== Taxonomy and naming ==
Diplodium angulatum was first formally described in 2017 by David L. Jones and Christopher J. French in the Australian Orchid Review, based on a type specimen collected in 1994. The specific epithet was derived from the Latin word angulatus, meaning 'angular', in reference to the angular nature of the flowers. In 2018, Jones and French transferred the species to the genus Pterostylis as P. angulata in a later edition of Australian Orchid Review. Prior to its formal description in 2017, informal names used to refer to this species in various publications included Pterostylis aff. nana, Pterostylis sp. 'Helena River', and Pterostylis sp. 'limestone'.

== Distribution and habitat ==
Pterostylis angulata is restricted to south-western Western Australia, with a somewhat coastal distribution ranging between Perth in the north and Bunbury in the south, reaching as far east as York and Collie. It is common within this range, which includes a number of reserves and national parks, though populations in some locations have declined due to fires and soil disturbance. It can be found in a variety of habitats including woodlands, swamps, and coastal forests and heaths. It tolerates a range of soil conditions, from sandy soils to heavy clay loams.

== Conservation status ==
This snail orchid is listed as not threatened by the Government of Western Australia Department of Biodiversity, Conservation and Attractions.
