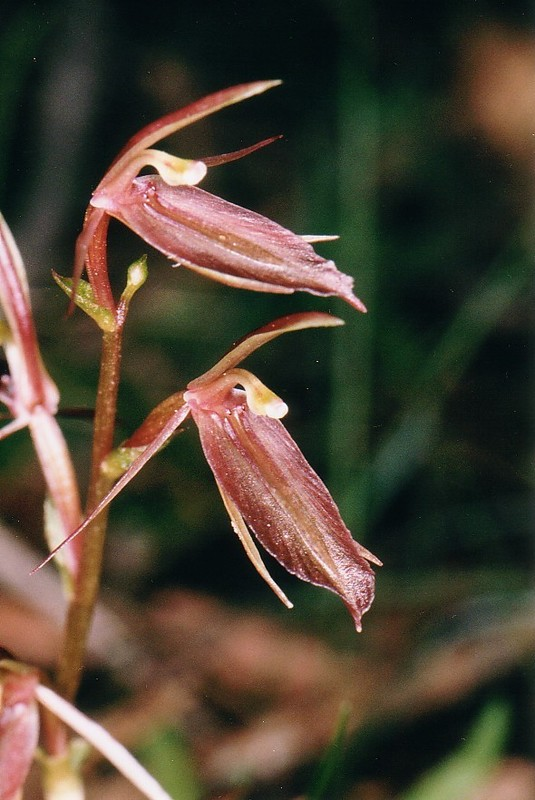
- Cyrtostylis robusta in the Serendip Sanctuary

Scientific classification
- Kingdom: Plantae
- Clade: Tracheophytes
- Clade: Angiosperms
- Clade: Monocots
- Order: Asparagales
- Family: Orchidaceae
- Subfamily: Orchidoideae
- Tribe: Diurideae
- Genus: Cyrtostylis
- Species: C. robusta

Binomial name
- Cyrtostylis robusta R.Br.

= Cyrtostylis robusta =

Large gnat orchid

Species of orchid

Cyrtostylis robusta, commonly known as large gnat-orchid or mosquito orchid, is a species of orchid endemic to southern Australia. It usually has a single more or less round leaf and a flowering spike with up to seven reddish flowers with a shelf-like labellum.

== Description ==
Cyrtostylis robusta is a terrestrial, perennial, deciduous, herb with a single heart-shaped, kidney-shaped or almost round leaf 16–60 mm (0.6–2 in) long and 20–40 mm (0.8–2 in) wide. The leaf is light to medium green on the upper surface and silvery on the lower side. Between two and seven pinkish red flowers 10–20 mm (0.4–0.8 in) long and about 6 mm (0.2 in) wide are borne on a flowering stem 40–300 mm (2–10 in) high. The pedicel is 5–11 mm (0.2–0.4 in) long with a bract at its base. The dorsal sepal is erect and curved forward, linear but tapered, 10–13 mm (0.4–0.5 in) long and about 2.5 mm (0.1 in) wide. The lateral sepals are linear, 10–11 mm (0.39–0.43 in) long, 1 mm (0.04 in) wide and curve forwards or downwards. The petals are similar in size and shape to the lateral sepals and curve forwards or slightly downwards. The labellum is oblong, 10–15 mm (0.4–0.6 in) long and 4–6 mm (0.16–0.24 in) wide and slopes slightly downwards with a few serrations near its pointed tip. Flowering occurs from May to October.

This species is similar to C. huegelii in Western Australia but usually has fewer, more brightly-coloured flowers with a wider labellum. In South Australia is can be distinguished from the similar C. reniformis which has more heavily veined leaves and are green on the lower side.

== Taxonomy and naming ==
Cyrtostylis robusta was first formally described in 1987 by David Jones and Mark Clements. The description was published in the journal Lindleyana from a specimen collected near Jerramungup. The specific epithet (robusta) is a Latin word meaning "oaken" or "strong like oak".

== Distribution and habitat ==
The large gnat orchid occurs in southern Victoria where it grows in coastal scrub and forest. It is found in south-eastern South Australia including Kangaroo Island and in Tasmania. It is most common and widespread in the south-west of Western Australia where it grows in near-coastal shrubland, woodland and forest between Perth and Israelite Bay.

== Conservation ==
Cyrtostylis robusta is listed as "rare" in Tasmania under the Threatened Species Protection Act 1995.
