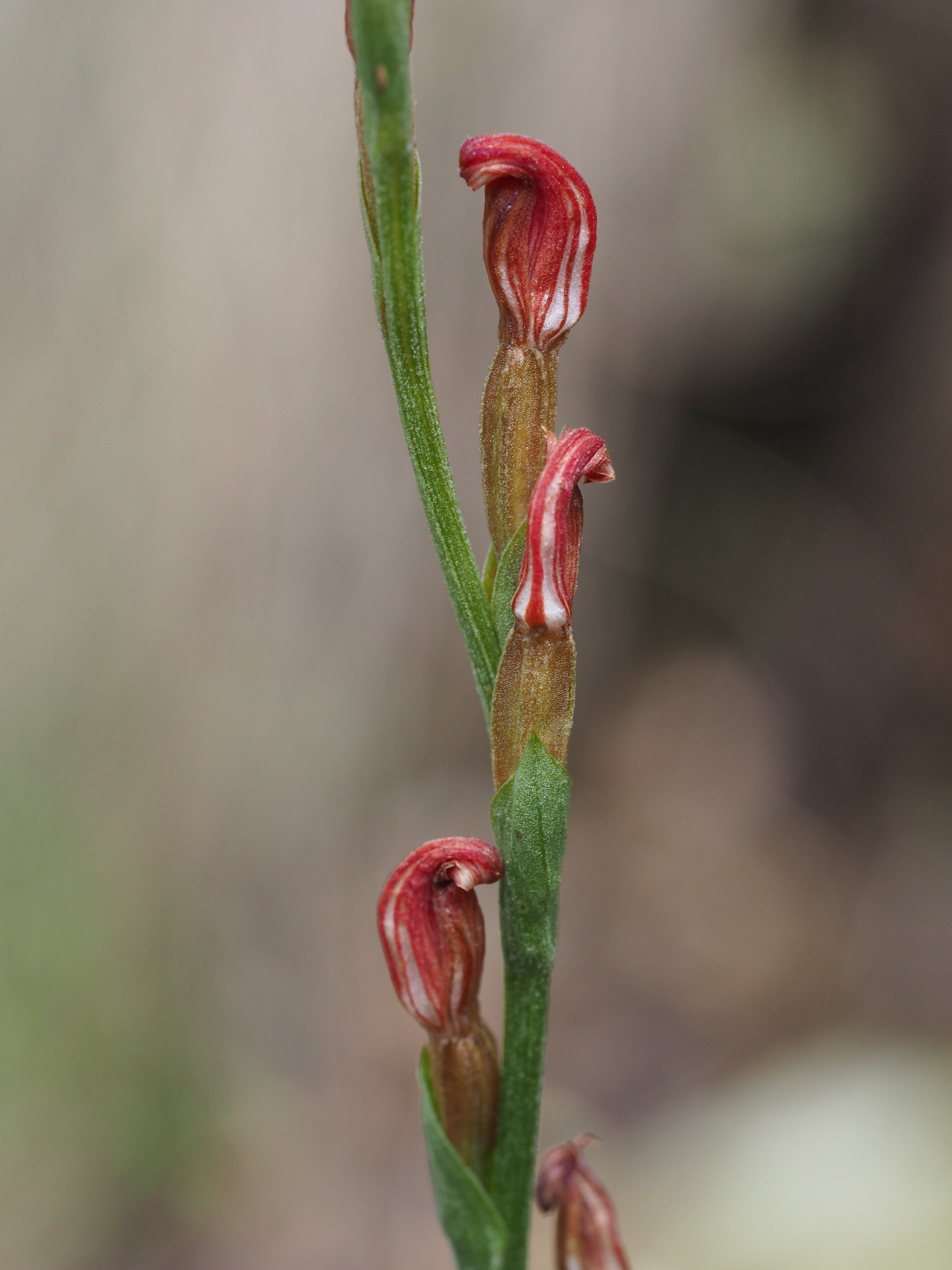

Scientific classification
- Kingdom: Plantae
- Clade: Tracheophytes
- Clade: Angiosperms
- Clade: Monocots
- Order: Asparagales
- Family: Orchidaceae
- Subfamily: Orchidoideae
- Tribe: Cranichideae
- Genus: Pterostylis
- Species: P. amabilis

Binomial name
- Pterostylis amabilis (D.L.Jones & L.M.Copel.) D.L.Jones

Synonyms
- Pterostylis amabile D.L.Jones orth. var.; Pterostylis sp. aff. parviflora (Ebor); Speculantha amabilis D.L.Jones & L.M.Copel.

= Pterostylis amabilis =

Species of orchid

Pterostylis amabilis is a species of orchid endemic to eastern Australia. As with similar orchids, the flowering plants differ from those which are not flowering. The non-flowering plants have a rosette of leaves but the flowering plants lack a rosette at the base but have up to ten tiny white and red to reddish-brown flowers. It is similar to P. parviflora but has larger rosette leaves and larger, more brightly coloured flowers.

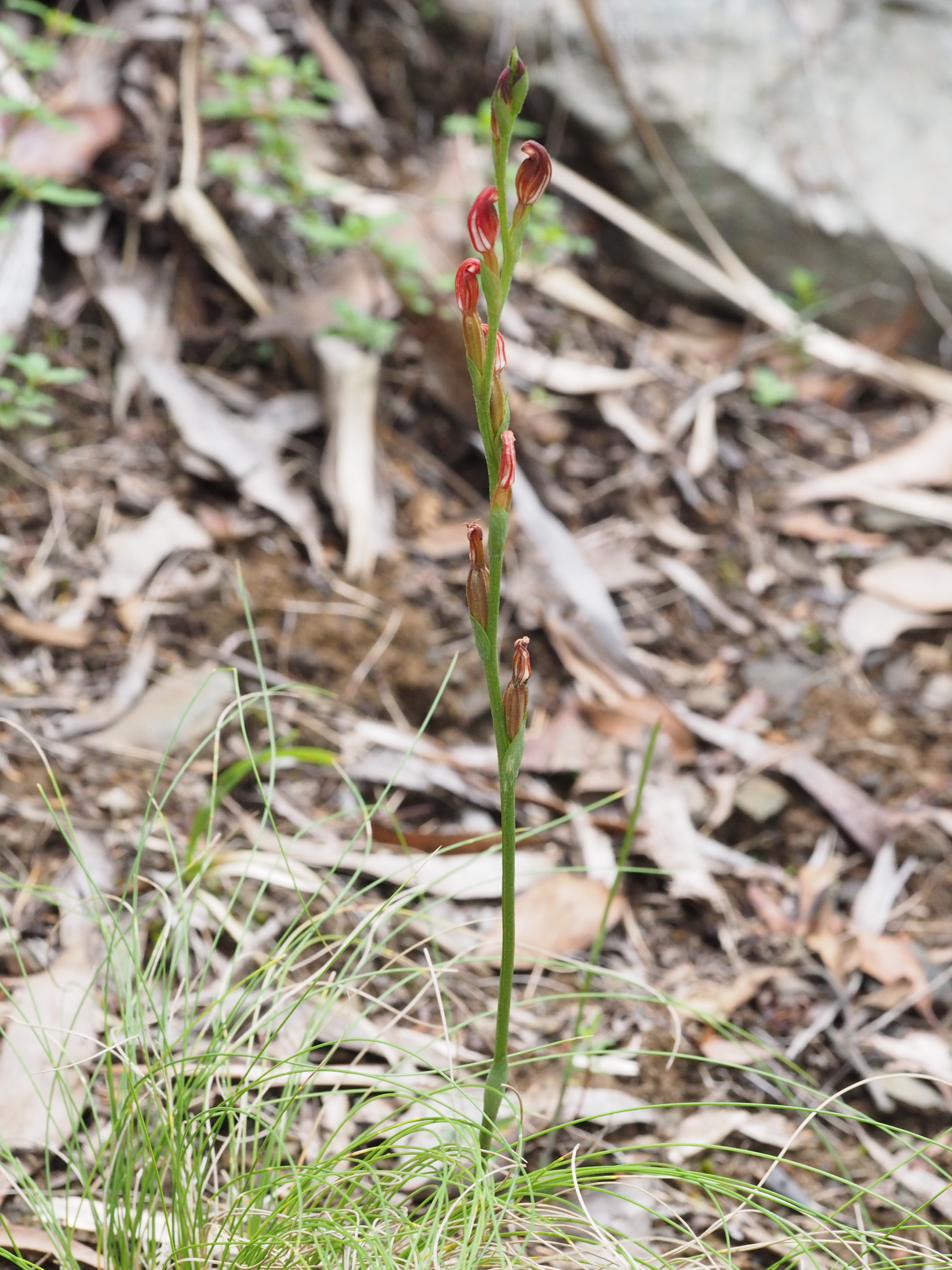
Habit in the New England National Park

== Description ==
Pterostylis amabilis is a terrestrial, perennial, deciduous, herb with an underground tuber and when not flowering, a rosette of three to five bright green, broad egg-shaped leaves which lie flat on the ground. Each leaf is 6–16 millimetres (0.2–0.6 in) long and 3–12 millimetres (0.1–0.5 in) wide. Flowering plants have up to ten well-spaced flowers 9–11 millimetres (0.4–0.4 in) long and 3–5 millimetres (0.1–0.2 in) wide borne on a thin, wiry spike 150–500 millimetres (6–20 in) high. Up to five leaf rosettes are arranged on the side of the flowering spike. The flowers are bright reddish-brown and white and usually up to four are open at once. The dorsal sepal and petals are fused, forming a hood or "galea" over the column. The galea has an inflated shape near its base and rough surface. The lateral sepals are erect, held closely against the galea with thread-like tips about 2 millimetres (0.08 in) long that do not project as far as the top of the galea. The sinus between the bases of the lateral sepals bulges forward and curves inward at the top. The labellum is not visible from outside the intact flower. Flowering occurs mainly in February and March.

== Taxonomy and naming ==
This greenhood was first formally described in 2014 by David Jones and Lachlan Copeland and given the name Speculantha amabilis. The description was published in the Australian Orchid Review. In 2015 Jones changed the name to Pterostylis amabilis "to allow for the different taxonomic views held at generic level within the subtribe". The specific epithet (amabilis) is a Latin word meaning "lovely", referring to the colour of the flowers.

== Distribution and habitat ==
Pterostylis amabilis grows in rich soil in moist, tall forest on the higher parts of the New England Tableland.
