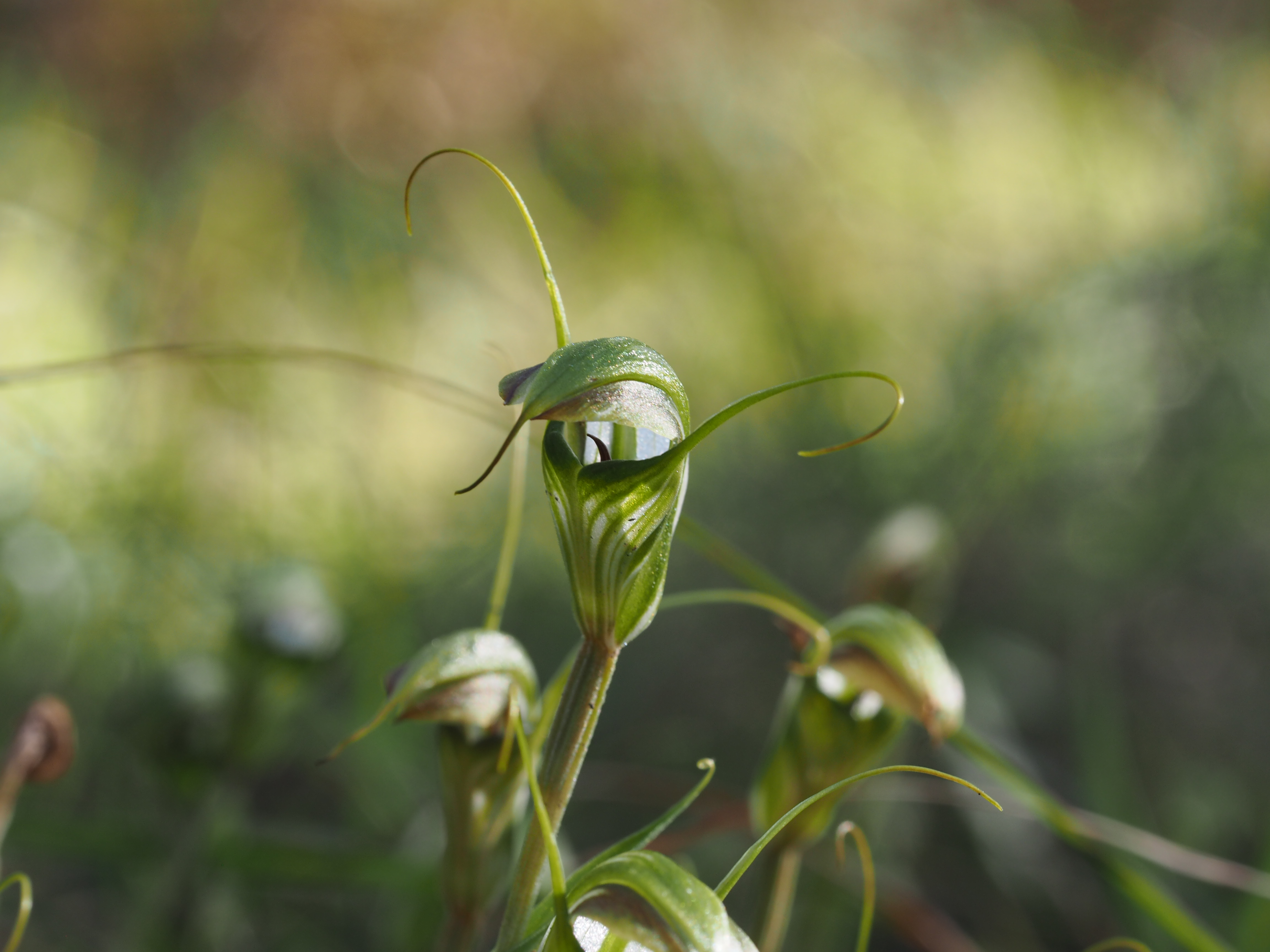
- At Gara Gorge

Scientific classification
- Kingdom: Plantae
- Clade: Tracheophytes
- Clade: Angiosperms
- Clade: Monocots
- Order: Asparagales
- Family: Orchidaceae
- Subfamily: Orchidoideae
- Tribe: Cranichideae
- Genus: Pterostylis
- Species: P. divaricata

Binomial name
- Pterostylis divaricata (D.L.Jones & L.M.Copel.) L.M.Copel. & D.L.Jones

Synonyms
- Diplodium divaricatum D.L.Jones & L.M.Copel.; Pterostylis divaricata (D.L.Jones & L.M.Copel.) J.M.H.Shaw isonym

= Pterostylis divaricata =

Northern striped greenhood

Species of orchid

Pterostylis divaricata, commonly known as northern striped greenhood, is a species of orchid endemic to northern New South Wales. It grows in colonies of genetically identical plants. As with similar orchids, plants in flower differ from those that are not. Those not in flower have a rosette of leaves that lie flat on the ground. Plants in flower lack a rosette at the base but have up to ten translucent white flowers with green and brown stripes. This greenhood is similar to P. striata but has larger flowers and a longer tip on the dorsal sepal.

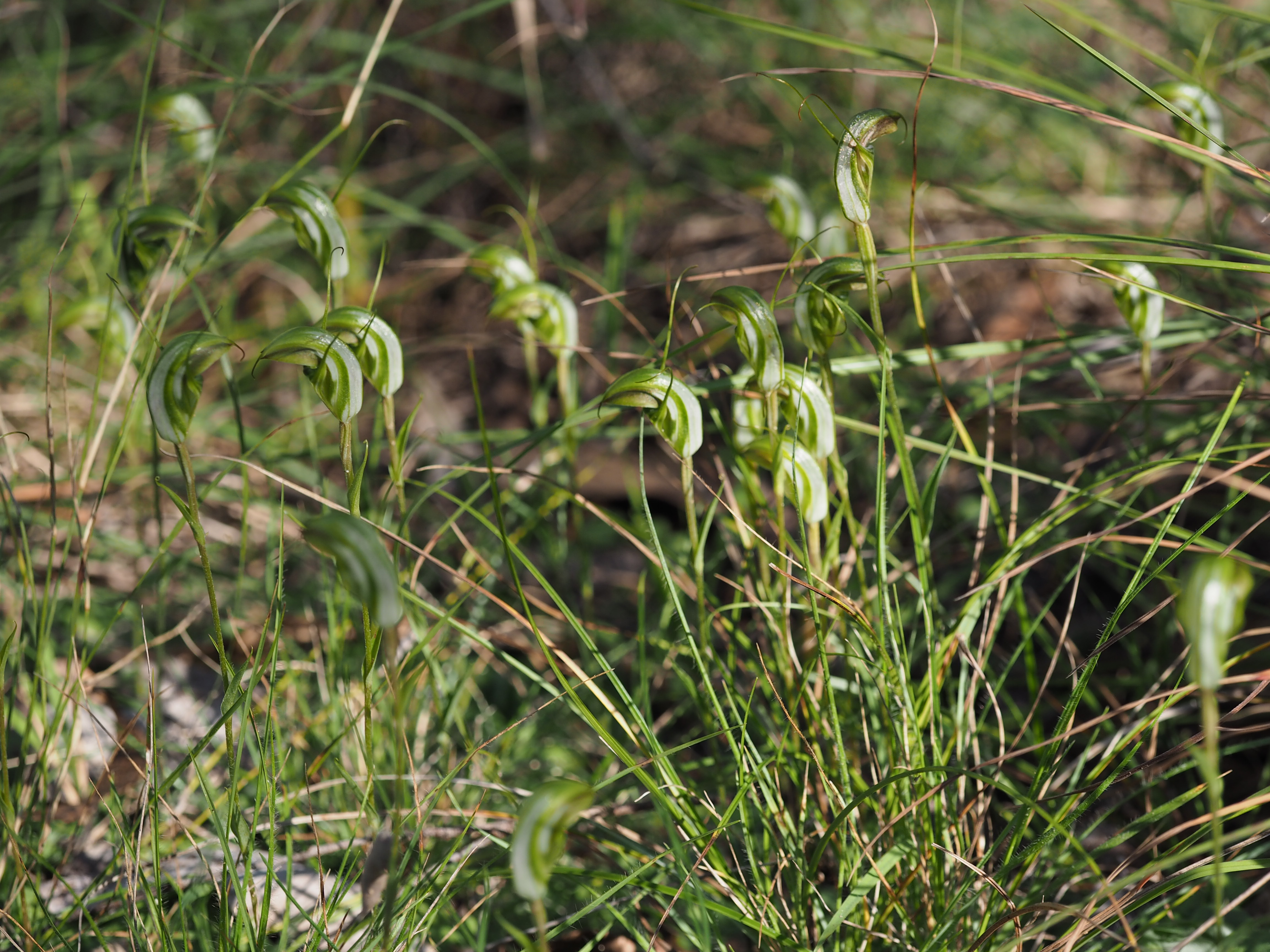
Habit

== Description ==
Pterostylis divaricata is a terrestrial, perennial, deciduous, herb with an underground tuber and when not flowering, a rosette of five to nine dark green, broad egg-shaped leaves that lie flat on the ground. Each leaf is 5–14 millimetres (0.2–0.6 in) long and 4–11 millimetres (0.2–0.4 in) wide. Plants in flower usually have only one, 25–30 millimetres (0.98–1.2 in) long, borne on a thin, smooth flowering stem 80–200 millimetres (3–8 in) high. Three to five dark green stem leaves 20–30 millimetres (0.8–1 in) long and 3–5 millimetres (0.1–0.2 in) wide are arranged on the side of the flowering spike. The flowers are translucent white with green and brown stripes. The dorsal sepal and petals are fused, forming a hood or "galea" over the column. The dorsal sepal is 35–40 millimetres (1–2 in) long, 10–12 millimetres (0.4–0.5 in) wide and gradually tapers to a thread-like tip 5–8 millimetres (0.2–0.3 in) long. The lateral sepals are erect, held closely against the galea with thread-like tips about 20–25 millimetres (0.8–1 in) long that are held high above the galea. The petals are oblong to lance-shaped, 24–28 millimetres (0.9–1 in) long, about 5 millimetres (0.2 in) wide and curved with flanges about 2 millimetres (0.08 in) wide. The sinus between the bases of the lateral sepals bulges forward with a V-shaped notch in the centre. The labellum is white with a brown tip and curves forward slightly, just visible above the sinus. Flowering occurs from March to May.

== Taxonomy and naming ==
This greenhood was first formally described in 2016 by David Jones and Lachlan Copeland and given the name Diplodium divaricatum. The description was published in the Australian Orchid Review from a specimen collected on Mount Duval. In the same year, the same authorities changed the name to Pterostylis divaricata "to allow for the different taxonomic views held at generic level within the subtribe". The specific epithet (divaricata) is a Latin word meaning "spread apart", referring to the spread tips of the lateral sepals.

This species has previously been known as Pterostylis sp. aff. alata.

== Distribution and habitat ==
Pterostylis divaricata grows with grasses, ferns and shrubs in woodland and forest on the higher parts between the New England Tableland and Mummel Gulf National Park.
