= Sensu =

Latin word meaning "in the sense of"

Sensu is a Latin word meaning "in the sense of". It is used in a number of fields including biology, geology, linguistics, semiotics, and law. Commonly it refers to how strictly or loosely an expression is used in describing any particular concept, but it also appears in expressions that indicate the convention or context of the usage.

== Common qualifiers ==
Sensu is the ablative case of the noun sensus, here meaning "sense". It is often accompanied by an adjective (in the same case). Three such phrases are:

- sensu stricto – "in the strict sense", abbreviation s.s. or s.str.;
- sensu lato – "in the broad sense", abbreviation s.l.;
- sensu amplo – "in a relaxed, generous (or 'ample') sense", a similar meaning to sensu lato.

Søren Kierkegaard uses the phrase sensu eminenti to mean "in the pre-eminent [or most important or significant] sense".

When appropriate, comparative and superlative adjectives may also be used to convey the meaning of "more" or "most". Thus sensu stricto becomes sensu strictiore ("in the stricter sense" or "more strictly speaking") and sensu strictissimo ("in the strictest possible sense" or "most strictly speaking").

Variants of phrases using the word sensu
Base phrase	Comparative	Superlative	Meanings
sensu stricto	sensu strictiore	sensu strictissimo	in the strict/stricter/strictest sense
sensu lato	sensu latiore	sensu latissimo	in the broad/broader/broadest sense
sensu amplo	sensu ampliore	sensu amplissimo	in a relaxed/more relaxed/most relaxed sense

Current definitions of the plant kingdom (Plantae) offer a biological example of when such phrases might be used. One definition of Plantae is that it consists of all green plants (comprising green algae and land plants), all red algae and all glaucophyte algae; the group defined in this way could be called Plantae in sensu lato (or simply Plantae sensu lato). A stricter definition excludes the red and glaucophyte algae; the group defined in this way could be called Plantae in sensu stricto. An even stricter definition excludes green algae, leaving only land plants; the group defined in this way could be called Plantae in sensu strictiore, or Plantae in sensu strictissimo.

Conversely, where convenient, some authors derive expressions such as "sensu non strictissimo", meaning "not in the narrowest possible sense".

A similar form is in use to indicate the sense of a particular context, such as "Nonmonophyletic groups are ... nonnatural (sensu cladistics) in that ..." or "... computation of a cladogram (sensu phenetics) ..."

Also the expression sensu auctorum (abbreviation: sensu auct.) is used to mean "in the sense of certain authors", who can be designated or described. It normally refers to a sense which is considered invalid and may be used in place of the author designation of a taxon in such a case (for instance, "Tricholoma amethystinum sensu auct." is an erroneous name for a mushroom which should really be "Lepista personata (Fr.) Cooke").

== Qualifiers and contexts ==
A related usage is in a concept-author citation ("sec. Smith", or "sensu Smith"), indicating that the intended meaning is the one defined by that author. (Here "sec." is an abbreviation of "secundum", meaning "following" or "in accordance with".) Such an author citation is different from the citation of the nomenclatural "author citation" or "authority citation". In biological taxonomy the author citation following the name of a taxon simply identifies the author who originally published the name and applied it to the type, the specimen or specimens that one refers to in case of doubt about the definition of a species. Given that an author (such as Linnaeus, for example) was the first to supply a definite type specimen and to describe it, it is to be hoped that his description would stand the tests of time and criticism, but even if it does not, then as far as practical the name that he had assigned will apply. It still will apply in preference to any subsequent names or descriptions that anyone proposes, whether his description was correct or not, and whether he had correctly identified its biological affinities or not. This does not always happen of course; all sorts of errors occur in practice. For example, a collector might scoop a netful of small fish and describe them as a new species; it then might turn out that he had failed to notice that there were several (possibly unrelated) species in the net. It then is not clear what he had named, so his name can hardly be taken seriously, either s.s. or s.l.

After a species has been established in this manner, specialist taxonomists may work on the subject and make certain types of changes in the light of new information. In modern practice it is greatly preferred that the collector of the specimens immediately passes them to specialists for naming; it is rarely possible for non-specialists to tell whether their specimens are of new species or not, and in modern times not many publications or their referees would accept an amateur description.

In any event, the person who finally classifies and describes a species has the task of taxonomic circumscription. Circumscription means in essence that anyone competent in the matter can tell which creatures are included in the species described, and which are excluded. It is in this process of species description that the question of the sense arises, because that is where the worker produces and argues their view of the proper circumscription. Equally, or perhaps even more strongly, the arguments for deciding questions concerning higher taxa such as families or orders, require very difficult circumscription, where changing the sense applied could totally upset an entire scheme of classification, either constructively or disastrously.

Note that the principles of circumscription apply in various ways in non-biological senses. In biological taxonomy the usual assumption is that circumscription reflects the shared ancestry perceived as most likely in the light of the currently available information; in geology or legal contexts far wider and more arbitrary ranges of logical circumscription commonly apply, not necessarily formally uniformly. However, the usage of expressions incorporating sensu remains functionally similarly intelligible among the fields. In geology for example, in which the concept of ancestry is looser and less pervasive than in biology, one finds usages such as:

- "This ambiguity ... has led to a ... dual interpretation of the Kimmeridgian Stage; the longer sensu anglico meaning, or the shorter sensu gallico meaning." Here the "anglico" or English meaning referred to interpretations by English geologists, derived from English materials and conditions, whereas "gallico" referred to interpretations by French and German geologists, derived from continental materials and conditions.
- "...genetic stratigraphic sequences sensu Galloway (1989)" meaning those sequences so referred to by Galloway, much as in the biological usage in referring to the terminology of particular authorities.
- "The second progradational unit plus PAN-4 are correlatable to the Pontian sensu stricto (sensu Sacchi 2001)." Here we have a meta-reference: the Pontian in the sense that Sacchi had applied it as sensu stricto.

== Examples in practical taxonomy ==
Sensu is used in the taxonomy of living creatures to specify which circumscription of a given taxon is meant, where more than one circumscription can be defined.

"The family Malvaceae s.s. is cladistically monophyletic."

This means that the members of the entire family of plants under the name Malvaceae (strictly speaking), over 1000 species, including the closest relatives of cotton and hibiscus, all descend from a shared ancestor, specifically, that they, and no other extant plant taxa, share a notional most recent common ancestor (MRCA). If this is correct, that ancestor might have been a single species of plant. Conversely the assertion also means that the family includes all surviving species descended from that ancestor. Other species of plants that some people might (broadly speaking or s.l.) have included in the family would not have shared that MRCA (or ipso facto they too would have been members of the family Malvaceae s.s. In short, this circumscription s.s. includes all and only plants that have descended from that particular ancestral stock.

"In the broader APG circumscription the family Malvaceae s.l. includes Malvaceae s.s. and also the families Bombacaceae, Sterculiaceae and Tiliaceae."

Here the circumscription is broader, stripped of some of its constraints by saying sensu lato; that is what speaking more broadly amounts to. Discarding such constraints might be for historical reasons, for example when people usually speak of the polyphyletic taxon because the members were long believed to form a "true" taxon and the standard literature still refers to them together. Alternatively a taxon might include members simply because they form a group that is convenient to work with in practice.

In this example, we can know from additional sources that we are dealing with the latter case: by adding other groups of plants to the family Malvaceae s.l., including those related to cacao, cola, durian, and jute, the APG circumscription omits some of the criteria by which the new members previously had been excluded. The s.l. group remains monophyletic.

"The 'clearly non-monophyletic' series Cyrtostylis sensu A.S. George has been virtually dismantled..."

This remark specifies Alex George's particular description of that series. It is a different kind of circumscription, alluding to the fact that A.S. George called them a series. "Sensu A.S. George" means that A.S. George discussed the Cyrtostylis in that series, and that members of that series are the ones under discussion in the same sense—how A. S. George saw them; the current author might or might not approve George's circumscription, but George's is the circumscription currently under consideration.

== See also ==
- Glossary of scientific naming
