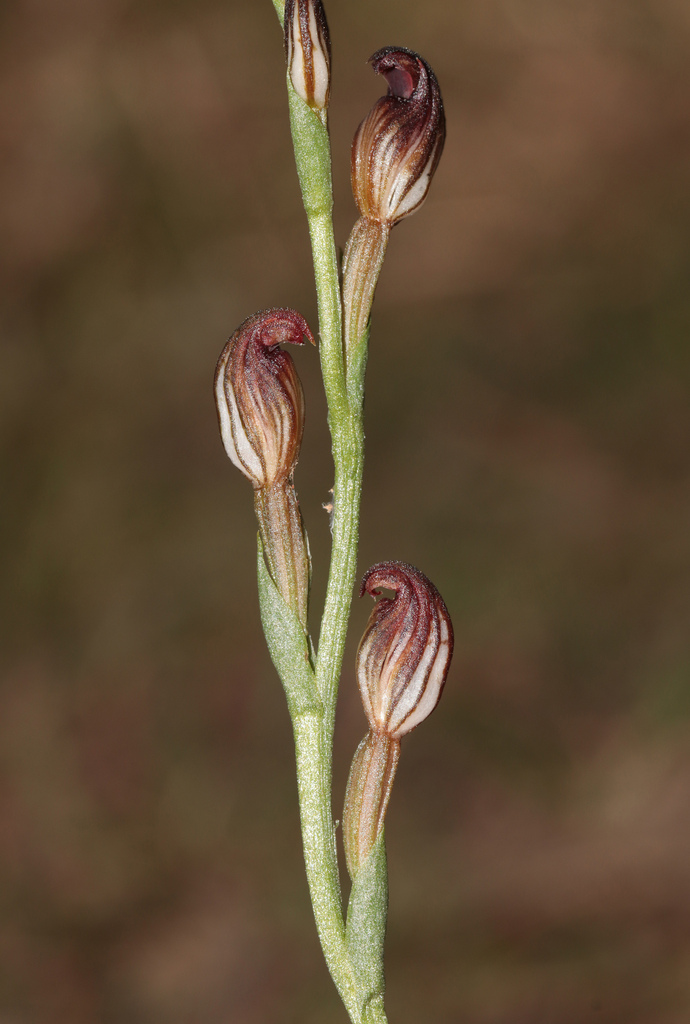
- Near the upper Orara River

Scientific classification
- Kingdom: Plantae
- Clade: Tracheophytes
- Clade: Angiosperms
- Clade: Monocots
- Order: Asparagales
- Family: Orchidaceae
- Subfamily: Orchidoideae
- Tribe: Cranichideae
- Genus: Pterostylis
- Species: P. rubiginosa

Binomial name
- Pterostylis rubiginosa (D.L.Jones & L.M.Copel.) L.M.Copel. & D.L.Jones

Synonyms
- Speculantha rubiginosa D.L.Jones & L.M.Copel.

= Pterostylis rubiginosa =

Species of orchid

Pterostylis rubiginosa is a species of orchid endemic to northeastern New South Wales. Flowering and non-flowering plants have a rosette of leaves that is withered by the time flowering occurs. Flowering plants have up to seven white flowers with rusty brown stripes, on a wiry flowering stem.

== Description ==
Pterostylis rubiginosa is a terrestrial, perennial, deciduous, herb with an underground tuber and when not flowering, a rosette of between two and seven spreading, egg-shaped leaves 5–10 mm (0.2–0.4 in) long and 4–8 mm (0.2–0.3 in) wide. Flowering plants have a similar rosette on side growth but the leaves wither before the flowers open. Up to seven flowers are well spaced along a thin, wiry flowering stem 100–250 mm (4–10 in) high but only about three flowers are open at the same time. The flowers are white with rusty brown stripes, 8–9 mm (0.3–0.4 in) long and about 3 mm (0.1 in) wide. The dorsal sepal and petals are fused, forming a hood or "galea" over the column. The dorsal sepal is lance-shaped to egg-shaped, 11–13 mm (0.4–0.5 in) long and 4–6 mm (0.16–0.24 in) wide, curves forward and has a short point. The lateral sepals are erect, held closely against the galea and joined for most of their length, leaving an opening about 2 mm (0.08 in) wide. The tips of the lateral sepals curve forwards and are about 2 mm (0.08 in) long but do not reach the top of the galea. The labellum is not visible above the sinus between the lateral sepals. Flowering has been observed between mid November and early December.

== Taxonomy and naming ==
This greenhood was first formally described in 2016 by David Jones and Lachlan Copeland and given the name Speculantha rubiginosa. The description was published in the Australian Orchid Review from a specimen collected in the Dorrigo National Park. In the same year, the same authorities changed the name to Pterostylis rubiginosa "to allow for the different taxonomic views held at generic level within the subtribe". The specific epithet (rubiginosa) means 'rusty red', referring to the colour of the flowers of this orchid.

This species is similar to others not yet formally published, including P. recta from near Wauchope and P. oresbia from the Barrington Tops and Werrikimbe National Parks.

== Distribution and habitat ==
This greenhood grows in open forest and nearby grassland in a small area of the Dorrigo National Park.,
