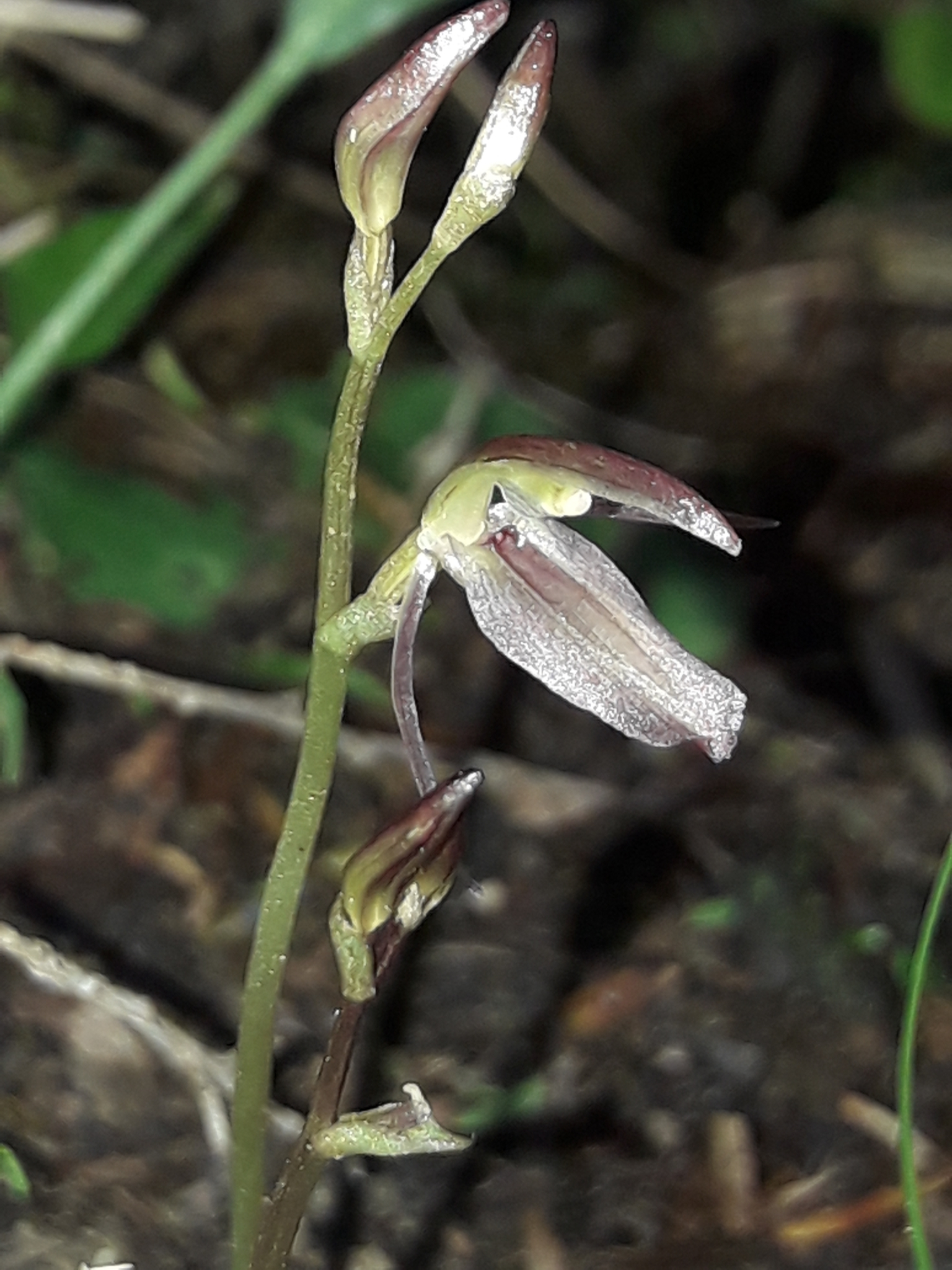
- In the South Wairarapa District, New Zealand

Scientific classification
- Kingdom: Plantae
- Clade: Tracheophytes
- Clade: Angiosperms
- Clade: Monocots
- Order: Asparagales
- Family: Orchidaceae
- Subfamily: Orchidoideae
- Tribe: Diurideae
- Genus: Cyrtostylis
- Species: C. rotundifolia

Binomial name
- Cyrtostylis rotundifolia Hook.f.

Synonyms
- Acianthus rotundifolius (Hook.f.) Schltr; Caladenia rotundifolia (Hook.f.) Rchb.f.; Cyrtostylis oblonga var. rotundifolia (Hook.f.) Cheeseman; Cyrtostylis macrophylla Hook.f.

= Cyrtostylis rotundifolia =

Winter orchid

Species of orchid

Cyrtostylis rotundifolia, commonly known as the winter orchid or gnat orchid, is a species of orchid endemic to New Zealand. It has a single egg-shaped leaf and a flowering stem with up to four pink or pinkish green flowers with a flat, oblong labellum. It is very similar to Cyrtostylis oblonga and more investigation is required to determine if they are distinct from each other.

== Description ==
Cyrtostylis rotundifolia is a terrestrial, perennial, deciduous, herb with a single kidney-shaped, egg-shaped, heart-shaped or almost round leaf 10–40 mm (0.4–2 in) long and 8–17 mm (0.3–0.7 in) wide. Up to four pink or pinkish green flowers 8–10 mm (0.3–0.4 in) long are borne on a thin flowering stem up to 100 mm (4 in) high. The dorsal sepal is erect, linear to narrow lance-shaped and the lateral sepals are narrow linear and somewhat smaller than the dorsal sepal. The petals are similar in size and shape to the lateral sepals. The labellum is flat, oval, about 10 mm (0.4 in) long 4 mm (0.16 in) wide with two round calli at the base and two parallel longitudinal ridges. The column is shorter than the labellum and has two wings widening towards the tip. Flowering occurs from June to October.

This species is very similar to C. oblonga and "the status of these two species requires further investigation". It has grey-green mostly egg-shaped leaves compared to the yellowish green, oblong leaves of C. oblonga.

== Taxonomy and naming ==
Cyrtostylis rotundifolia was first formally described in 1853 by Joseph Dalton Hooker and the description was published in Flora Novae-Zelandiae. The specific epithet (rotundifolia) is derived from the Latin words rotundus meaning "round", "circular" or "spherical" and folium meaning "leaf".

== Distribution and habitat ==
The winter orchid grows in lightly shaded scrub and open in areas on the southern half of the North Island and the lower two-thirds of the South Island of New Zealand.
