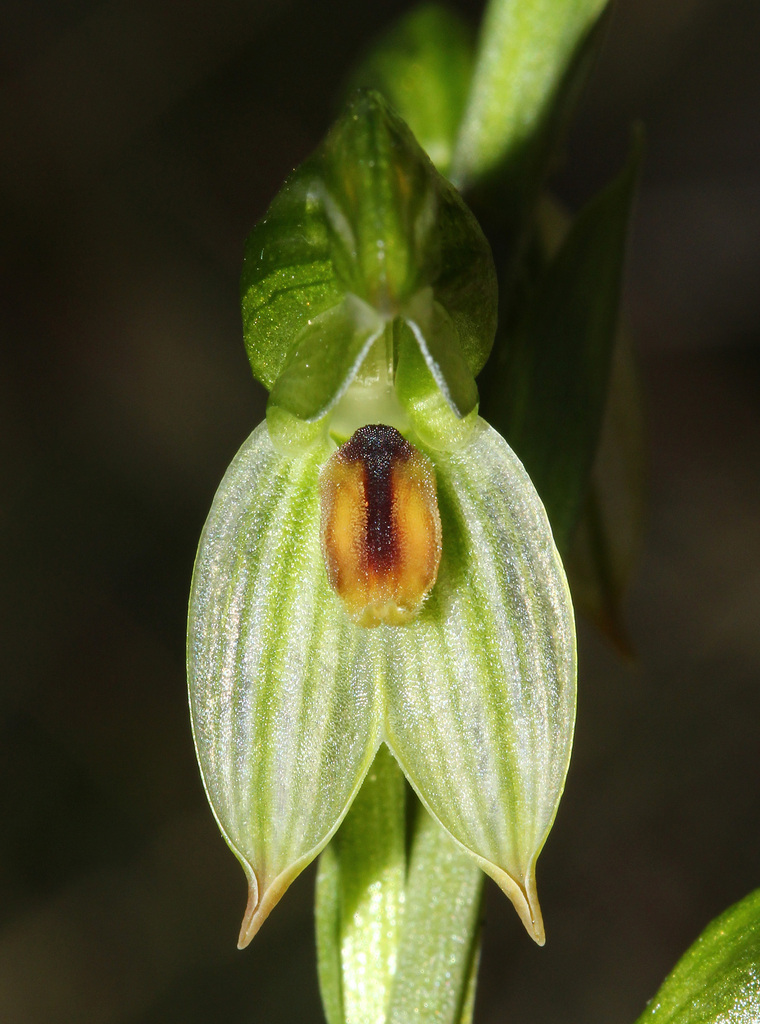

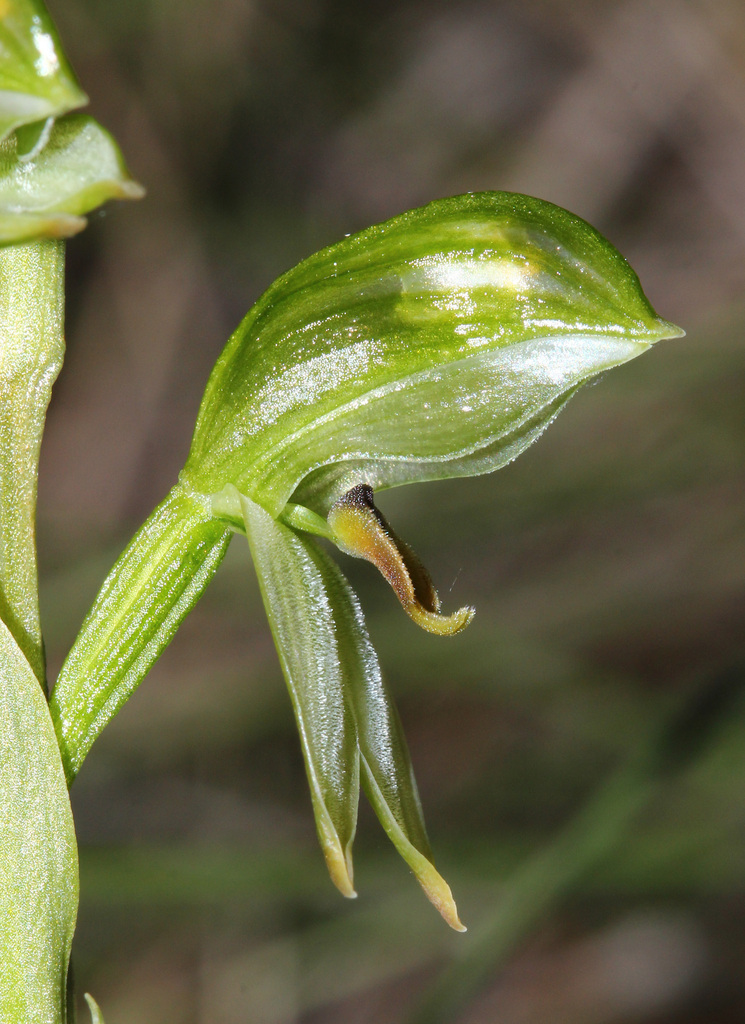
- images - Lachlan Copeland

Scientific classification
- Kingdom: Plantae
- Clade: Tracheophytes
- Clade: Angiosperms
- Clade: Monocots
- Order: Asparagales
- Family: Orchidaceae
- Subfamily: Orchidoideae
- Tribe: Cranichideae
- Genus: Pterostylis
- Species: P. readii

Binomial name
- Pterostylis readii (D.L.Jones & L.M.Copel.) D.L.Jones

Synonyms
- Bunochilus readii D.L.Jones & L.M.Copel.

= Pterostylis readii =

Species of orchid

Pterostylis readii is a plant in the orchid family Orchidaceae and is endemic to New South Wales.

It was first described in 2017 as Bunochilus readii by David L. Jones and Lachlan Copeland, but was transferred to the genus, Pterostylis, in 2019 by David L. Jones.

It has been found only on the upper slopes of Mount Kaputar, NSW, growing in woodland at altitudes of 1100 to 1200 m.

It flowers from August to September.
