= Pterostylis antennifera =

Scientific classification
- Kingdom: Plantae
- Clade: Tracheophytes
- Clade: Angiosperms
- Clade: Monocots
- Order: Asparagales
- Family: Orchidaceae
- Subfamily: Orchidoideae
- Tribe: Cranichideae
- Genus: Pterostylis
- Species: P. antennifera

Binomial name
- Pterostylis antennifera (D.L.Jones) D.L.Jones

Synonyms
- Speculantha antennifera D.L.Jones; Pterostylis sp. (Mt Moffat NP R.Crane 2037)

Species of plant

Pterostylis antennifera is a species of greenhood orchid native to eastern Australia. It is similar in appearance to Pterostylis parviflora, but can be differentiated by the size and shape of their flowers.

== Description ==
Pterostylis antennifera is a herbaceous terrestrial orchid with 1-2 basal rosettes of 5-12 leaves, dull green in colour, each measuring 5–20 mm (0.20–0.79 in) long and 6–12 mm (0.24–0.47 in) wide. When flowering, this species produces an inflorescence of 1-10 flowers on a stalk measuring 12–35 cm (4.7–13.8 in) tall. The flowers are green and white striped, flushed with brown towards the apex, 7–9 mm (0.28–0.35 in) long and 3–3.5 mm (0.12–0.14 in) wide, and are notable for their short lateral sepals whose free points are thin and antennae-like. Flowering occurs from March to May.

== Distribution and habitat ==
Pterostylis antennifera is found in the states of Queensland and New South Wales, occurring in forested coastal, near coastal, and inland areas between Blackdown Tableland National Park in Queensland and Dubbo in New South Wales. It is common within this range. It grows in a range of forested habitats but most often in woodlands where the understory is sparse. It is capable of growing on slopes and ridges and can sometimes be found growing in shallow soils on rocky outcrops.

== Taxonomy and naming ==
Speculantha antennifera was first formally described in 2015 by David L. Jones based on a type specimen collected in 1990 from an area to the north-east of Dubbo, New South Wales. The specific epithet was derived from the Latin word antenna, meaning 'feeler', in reference to the thin free points on the lateral sepals. In 2017, Jones and Christopher J. French transferred the species to the genus Pterostylis as P. antennifera in a later edition of Australian Orchid Review.
