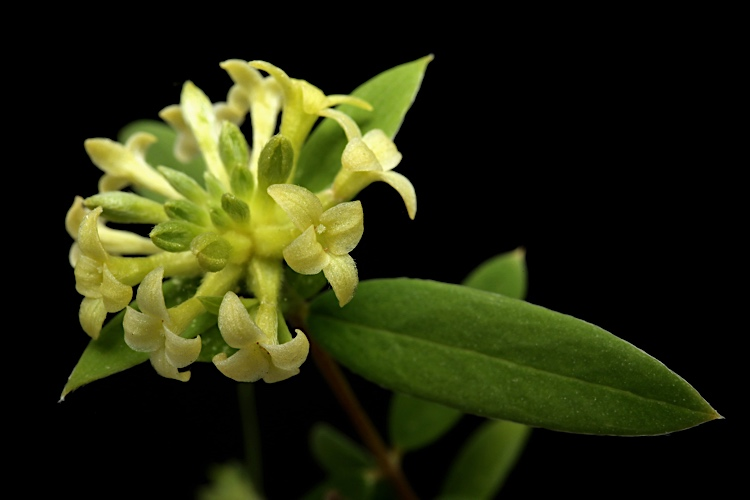

Scientific classification
- Kingdom: Plantae
- Clade: Tracheophytes
- Clade: Angiosperms
- Clade: Eudicots
- Clade: Rosids
- Order: Malvales
- Family: Thymelaeaceae
- Genus: Pimelea
- Species: P. cremnophila

Binomial name
- Pimelea cremnophila L.M.Copel. & I.Telford

= Pimelea cremnophila =

Species of shrub

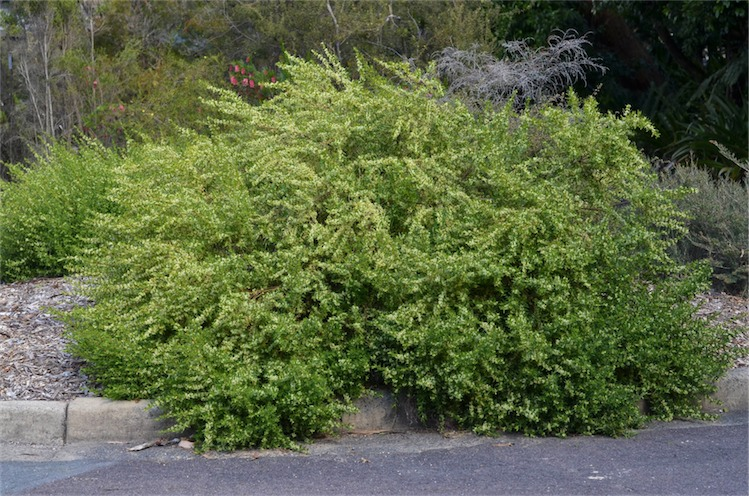
Habit in the Australian National Botanic Gardens

Pimelea cremnophila, commonly known as gorge rice-flower, is a species of flowering plant in the family Thymelaeaceae and is endemic to a restricted area of New South Wales. It is an erect shrub with narrowly elliptic to narrowly egg-shaped leaves arranged in opposite pairs, and groups of up to four flowers that are sometimes male-only or female-only.

== Description ==
Pimelea cremnophila is an erect shrub that typically grows to a height of up to 2.5 m (8 ft 2 in) and has reddish-brown stems, covered with bristly hairs when young. Its leaves are narrowly elliptic to narrowly egg-shaped, 10–37 mm (0.39–1.46 in) long and 2.5–6 mm (0.098–0.236 in) wide on a densely hairy petiole about 1 mm (0.039 in) long. The flowers are borne on the ends of branches or in leaf axils, singly or in groups of up to four on a peduncle about 1 mm (0.039 in) long. There are leaf like bracts 2.5–5 mm (0.098–0.197 in) long at the base of the flowers but that fall off as the flowers develop. Some flowers are functionally male, others functionally female and the remainder bisexual. Bisexual flowers have a floral tube 4.0–6.5 mm (0.16–0.26 in) long and sepals 3–4 mm (0.12–0.16 in) long, male flowers a longer floral tube, and female flowers a shorter floral tube and smaller sepals. Flowering has been observed in October, but is likely to occur throughout spring.

== Taxonomy ==
Pimelea cremnophila was first formally described in 2006 by Lachlan Copeland and Ian Telford from specimens collected in the Oxley Wild Rivers National Park in 2004. The specific epithet (cremnophila) means "cliff-loving".

== Distribution and habitat ==
Gorge rice-flower grows on exposed cliff-tops and sheltered cliff-sides at altitudes between 1,050 and 1,090 m (3,440 and 3,580 ft) in the southern part of the Oxley Wild Rivers National Park.

== Conservation status ==
At the time of writing their paper, Copeland and Telford reported that P. cremniphila was "known from fewer than 100 individuals". In 2015, a visit by Copeland to the area failed to find two of the three populations. The main threats to the species are grazing by feral goats, drought and inappropriate fire regimes. The species is listed as "critically endangered" under the New South Wales Government Biodiversity Conservation Act 2016.
