= Homoranthus cummingii =

Scientific classification
- Kingdom: Plantae
- Clade: Tracheophytes
- Clade: Angiosperms
- Clade: Eudicots
- Clade: Rosids
- Order: Myrtales
- Family: Myrtaceae
- Genus: Homoranthus
- Species: H. cummingii

Binomial name
- Homoranthus cummingii L.M.Copel.

Species of flowering plant

Homoranthus cummingii is a plant in the myrtle family Myrtaceae and is endemic to a small area in Queensland. It is an upright shrub with pointed, linear leaves arranged in alternating opposite pairs so they form four rows along the branchlets. The flowers hang downwards in pairs and are creamy white to pale yellow, turning red as they age. It is only known from Mount Zero north-west of Townsville.

== Description ==
Flowers sporadically throughout the year, in particular September, January and May.

== Taxonomy and naming ==
Homoranthus cummingii was first formally described in 2011 by Lachlan Copeland, Lyndley Craven and Jeremy Bruhl from a specimen collected on the private property Mount Zero in 2007 and the description was published in Australian Systematic Botany. The specific epithet (cummingii) honours Russell John Cumming, who discovered the species.

== Distribution and habitat ==
Known only from the vicinity of Mount Zero ~85 km west of Townsville, Queensland. Plants grow in shallow, sandy soils among granite rocks.

== Conservation status ==
Plant population appears to be about 30-50 plants in an area managed by Australian Wildlife Conservancy. Inappropriate fire regime and severe drought may be a potential threat. A ROTAP conservation code of 2E is recommended following the criteria of Briggs and Leigh (1996). It satisfies the IUCN criteria (2010) to be considered 'Critically Endangered'.
