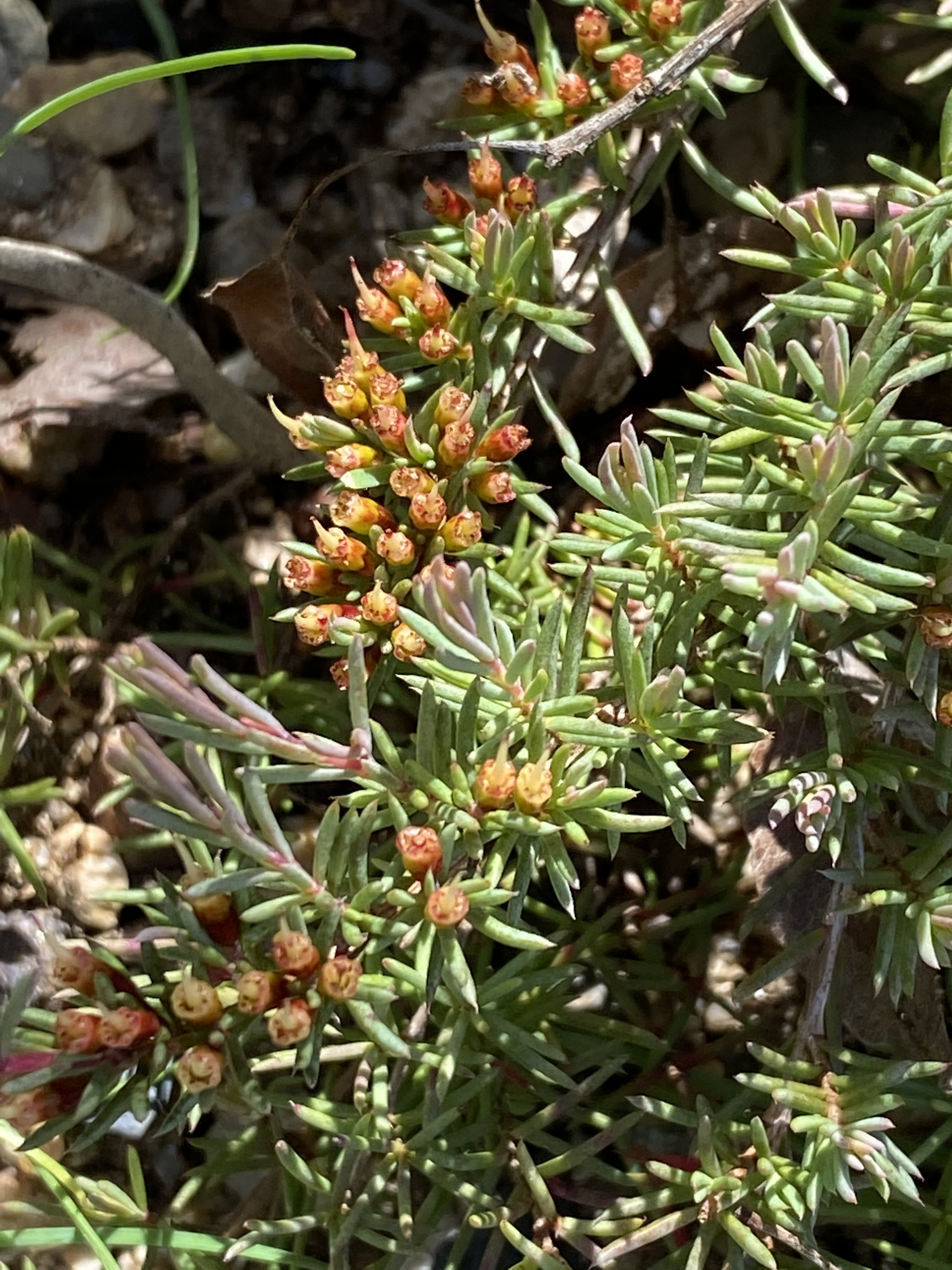

Scientific classification
- Kingdom: Plantae
- Clade: Tracheophytes
- Clade: Angiosperms
- Clade: Eudicots
- Clade: Rosids
- Order: Myrtales
- Family: Myrtaceae
- Genus: Homoranthus
- Species: H. vagans

Binomial name
- Homoranthus vagans L.M.Copel.

= Homoranthus vagans =

Species of flowering plant

Homoranthus vagans is a species of flowering plant in the family Myrtaceae and is endemic to a small area in southern Queensland. It is a shrub with pointed linear leaves and groups of up to ten yellow flowers in leaf axils near the end of branchlets. It is only known from a single population north of Inglewood.

== Description ==
Homoranthus vagans is a shrub 0.05–0.2 m (2–8 in) high and 0.5–2 m (2–7 ft) wide. The aromatic leaves are a dull grey-green, blade shaped and arranged opposite along the stem. The branchlets have 3-10 flowers held erect in leaf axils. Flowers have been recorded from August to October.

== Taxonomy and naming ==
Homoranthus vagans was first formally described in 2011 by Lachlan Copeland, Lyndley Craven and Jeremy Bruhl from a specimen collected by Copeland in 2001 and the description was published in Australian Systematic Botany. The specific epithet (vagans) is derived from the Latin word vagus meaning "wandering" or "unsettled", referring to habit of young branchlets of "wandering" over the ground, sometimes attaching to the ground with adventitious roots.

== Distribution and habitat ==
This species is currently known from two populations north west of Inglewood. Plants grow in deep sandy soil derived from sandstone.

== Conservation status ==
Homoranthus vagans is currently known from two small populations on leasehold land. ROTAP conservation code 2V using Briggs and Leigh (1996) and IUCN (2010) considered vulnerable.
