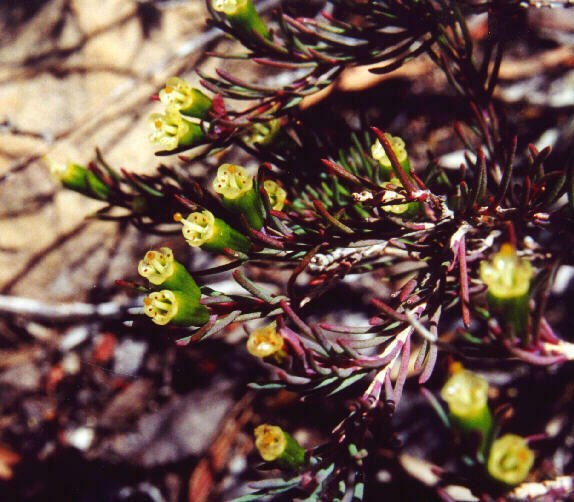
- (September 2000, Duaringa, QLD, image Lachlan Copeland)

Scientific classification
- Kingdom: Plantae
- Clade: Tracheophytes
- Clade: Angiosperms
- Clade: Eudicots
- Clade: Rosids
- Order: Myrtales
- Family: Myrtaceae
- Genus: Homoranthus
- Species: H. brevistylis

Binomial name
- Homoranthus brevistylis L.M.Copel.

= Homoranthus brevistylis =

Species of flowering plant

Homoranthus brevistylis is a plant in the family Myrtaceae and is endemic to a small area in Queensland. It is an upright shrub with pointed, linear leaves and groups of up to four pale yellow flowers in leaf axils. It is only known from the Blackdown Tableland National Park.

== Description ==
Homoranthus brevistylis is an ascending shrub to 0.2–0.4 m (0.7–1 ft) high and 0.5–2 m (2–7 ft) wide. The leaves are aromatic, dull grey-green, and arranged in opposite pairs. The peak flowering time is in spring but has been recorded from May to September.

== Taxonomy and naming ==
Homoranthus brevistylis was first formally described in 2011 by Lachlan Copeland, Lyndley Craven and Jeremy Bruhl from a specimen collected on the Blackdown Tableland in 2000 and the description was published in Australian Systematic Botany. The specific epithet (brevistylis) refers to the short style of this species.

== Distribution and habitat ==
This homoranthus is found in a single population ~100km south-east of Emerald, Queensland. It grows in skeletal, sandy soil in crevices of sandy outcrops.

== Conservation status ==
Due to its small population a ROTAP conservation code 2ECit using Briggs and Leigh criteria (1996). IUCN (2010) 'Endangered'.
