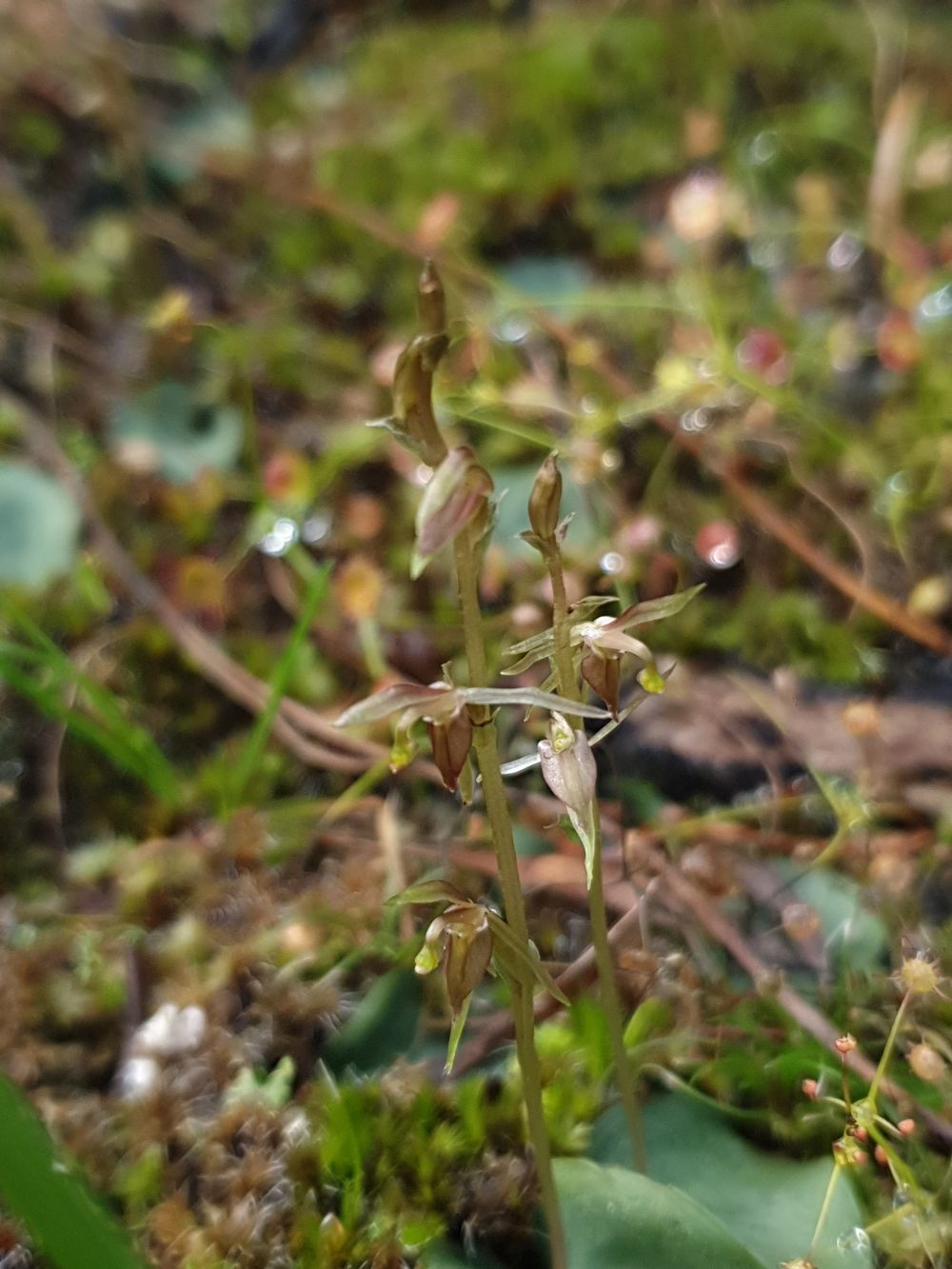

Scientific classification
- Kingdom: Plantae
- Clade: Tracheophytes
- Clade: Angiosperms
- Clade: Monocots
- Order: Asparagales
- Family: Orchidaceae
- Subfamily: Orchidoideae
- Tribe: Diurideae
- Genus: Cyrtostylis
- Species: C. tenuissima

Binomial name
- Cyrtostylis tenuissima (Nicholls & Goadby) D.L.Jones & M.A.Clem.

Synonyms
- Acianthus tenuissimus Nicholls & Goadby

= Cyrtostylis tenuissima =

Dwarf gnat orchid

Species of orchid

Cyrtostylis tenuissima, commonly known as dwarf gnat orchid or dwarf mosquito orchid, is a species of orchid endemic to Western Australia. It usually has a single more or less round leaf and a flowering spike with up to fourteen small, green flowers with a greenish brown to pinkish, wedge-shaped labellum.

== Description ==
Cyrtostylis tenuissima is a terrestrial, perennial, deciduous, herb with a single more or less round leaf 10–30 mm (0.4–1 in) long and 10–20 mm (0.4–0.8 in) wide. The leaf is green on both surfaces. Between two and fifteen green flowers about 5 mm (0.2 in) long and 3 mm (0.1 in) wide are borne on a flowering stem 50–200 mm (2–8 in) high. The dorsal sepal is erect and curved forward, 6–7 mm (0.2–0.3 in) long and 1–1.5 mm (0.04–0.06 in) wide. The lateral sepals are a similar size to the lateral sepals, turn downwards and often cross over each other. The petals are 7–8 mm (0.28–0.31 in) long, about 1 mm (0.04 in) wide and spread apart from each other. The labellum is wedge-shaped with a pointed tip, 4–5 mm (0.16–0.20 in) long, about 3 mm (0.12 in) wide and slopes downwards. Flowering occurs from September to November.

== Taxonomy and naming ==
Darf gnat orchid was first formally described in 1933 by William Henry Nicholls and Bede Goadby who gave it the name Acianthus tenuissimus. The description was published in The Victorian Naturalist from a specimen collected near Bayswater. In 1987 David Jones and Mark Clements changed the name to Cyrtostylis tenuissima. The specific epithet (tenuissima) is the superlative form of the Latin word tenuis meaning "thin", hence "thinnest".

== Distribution and habitat ==
The dwarf gnat orchid grows under shrubs and grasstrees around winter-wet areas between Perth and Albany with disjunct populations near Esperance.

== Conservation ==
Cyrtostylis tenuissima is listed as "not threatened" by the Western Australian Government Department of Parks and Wildlife.
