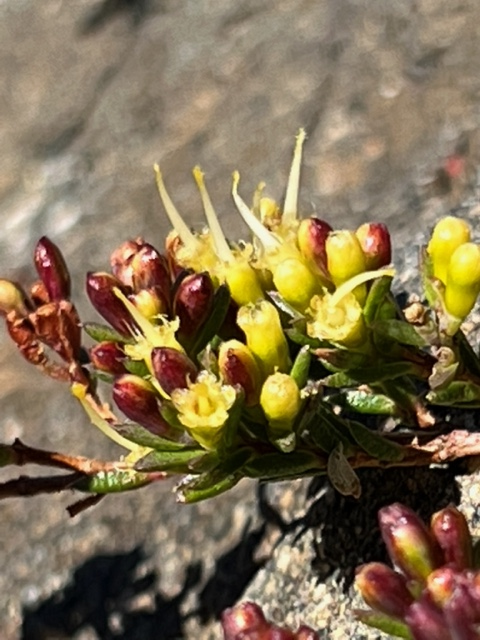

Conservation status
- Critically endangered (EPBC Act)

Scientific classification
- Kingdom: Plantae
- Clade: Tracheophytes
- Clade: Angiosperms
- Clade: Eudicots
- Clade: Rosids
- Order: Myrtales
- Family: Myrtaceae
- Genus: Homoranthus
- Species: H. bebo

Binomial name
- Homoranthus bebo L.M.Copel.
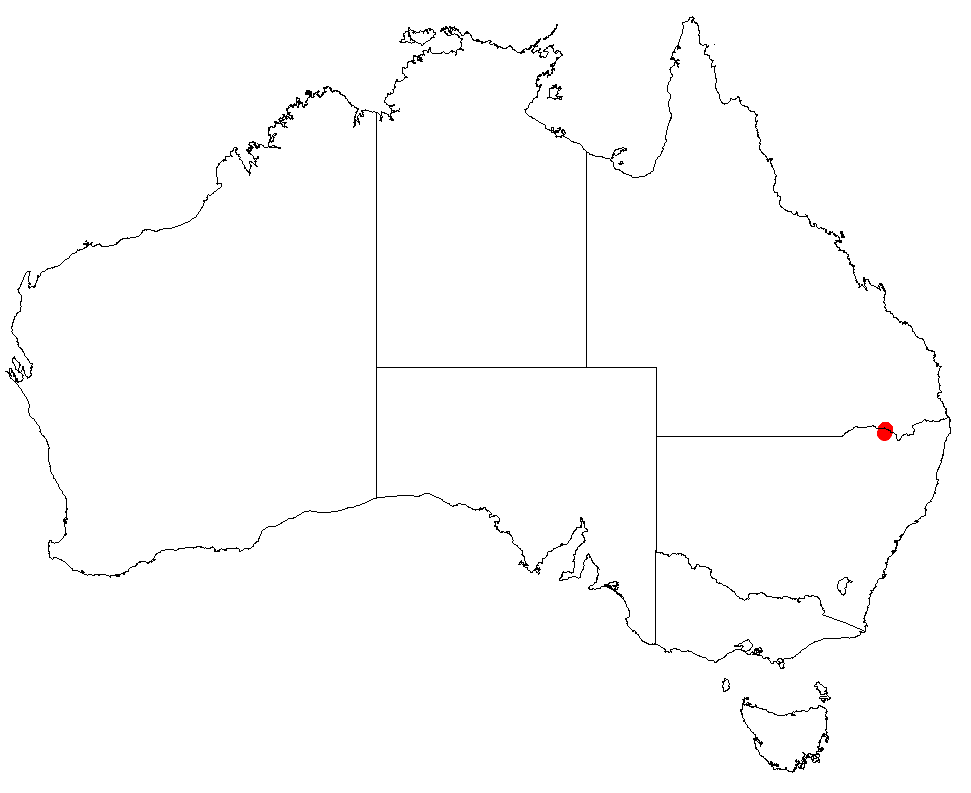
- Occurrence data from AVH

= Homoranthus bebo =

Species of flowering plant

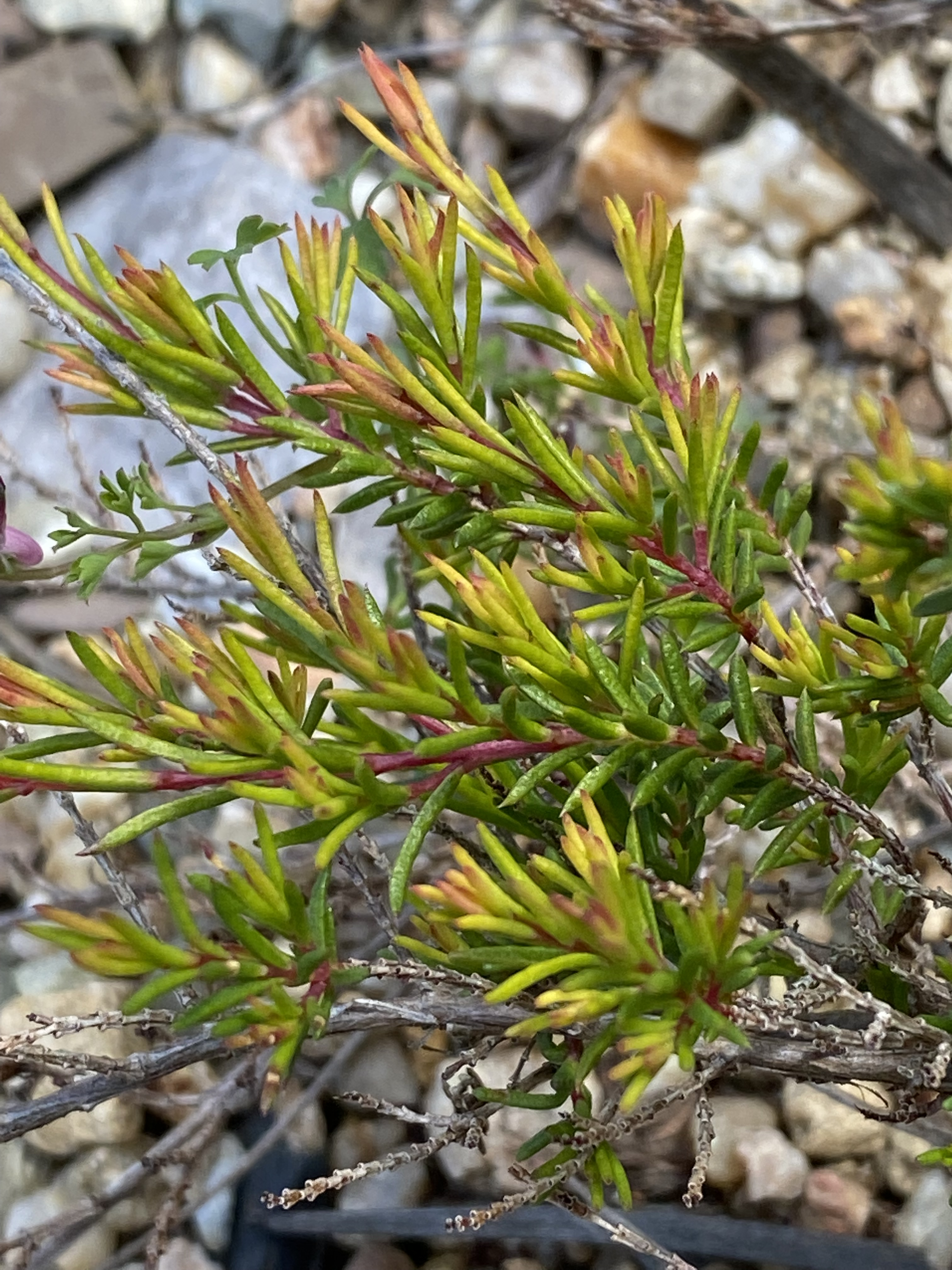
Foliage

Homoranthus bebo is a flowering plant in the family Myrtaceae and is endemic to a small area in northern New South Wales. It is a low-lying shrub with leaves that are usually flat and with groups of up to ten yellow flowers. It is only known from the Dthinna Dthinnawan National Park near Yetman.

== Description ==
Homoranthus bebo is a small shrub 0.05–0.2 m (2–8 in) high and 0.5–2 m (20–80 in) wide with branches lying close to the ground. The leaves are narrowly egg-shaped, shiny, lime-green, 3–7 mm (0.1–0.3 in) long, smooth, arranged in opposite pairs along a short stem with a short protruding point at the apex. The single lemon coloured five petal flowers are held erect in the leaf axils on a peduncle 0.7–1.7 mm (0.028–0.067 in) long. Flowering occurs mostly from September to November.

== Taxonomy and naming ==
Homoranthus bebo was first formally described in 2011 by Lachlan Copeland, Lyndley Craven and Jeremy Bruhl from a specimen collected in the Bebo State forest (now the Dthinna Dthinnawan Nature Reserve) in 2001 and the description was published in Australian Systematic Botany. The specific epithet (bebo) refers to the name of the state forest where the type specimen was collected.

== Distribution and habitat ==
Currently known from a single population in Dthinna Dthinnawan National Park (formerly Bebo State Forest) about 20 km (12 mi) north-north-east of Yetman New South Wales. This species grows in deep sandy soils over sandstone.

== Conservation ==
Homoranthus bebo is classified as "critically endangered" under the Australian Government EPBC Act of 1999. It is known from a single population of at least 300 individuals.
