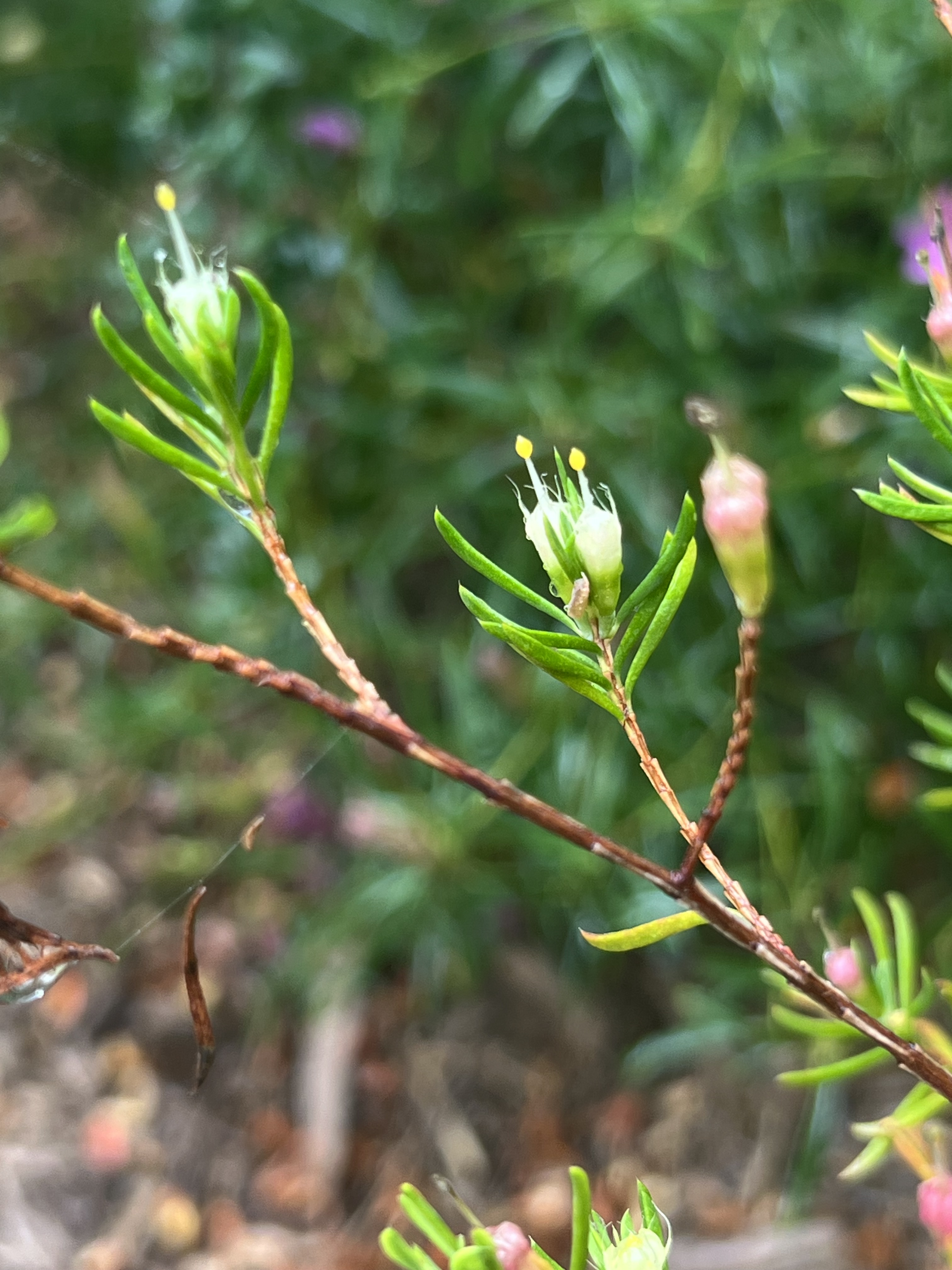

Scientific classification
- Kingdom: Plantae
- Clade: Tracheophytes
- Clade: Angiosperms
- Clade: Eudicots
- Clade: Rosids
- Order: Myrtales
- Family: Myrtaceae
- Genus: Homoranthus
- Species: H. bruhlii

Binomial name
- Homoranthus bruhlii L.M.Copel.

= Homoranthus bruhlii =

Species of flowering plant

Homoranthus bruhlii is a plant in the family Myrtaceae and is endemic to a small area on the Northern Tablelands of New South Wales. It is an upright shrub with glabrous, pale green, linear leaves and with groups of three or four pale yellowish green flowers in leaf axils. It is only known from a single population near Tenterfield.

== Description ==
The five petalled flowers are held erect in leaf axils and have been recorded in October and November, with fruits forming shortly afterwards.

== Taxonomy and naming ==
Homoranthus bruhlii was first formally described in 2011 by Lachlan Copeland, Lyndley Craven and Jeremy Bruhl from a specimen collected on private property near Tenterfield in 2002. The description was published in Australian Systematic Botany. The specific epithet (bruhlii) honours Jeremy Bruhl, Professor of Botany at the University of New England.

== Distribution and habitat ==
This homoranthus grows in skeletal, sandy soil among crevices of granite outcrops.

== Conservation status ==
Homoranthus bruhlii is currently known form a single population of ~20 plants over an area <1ha (2.47 acres). Threatened by an inappropriate fire regime, grazing by feral goats and critically low numbers. A ROTAP conservation code of 2E is recommended following criteria of Briggs and Leigh (1996) H. bruhlii satisfies the criteria of the IUCN (2010) to be considered 'Critically Endangered.
