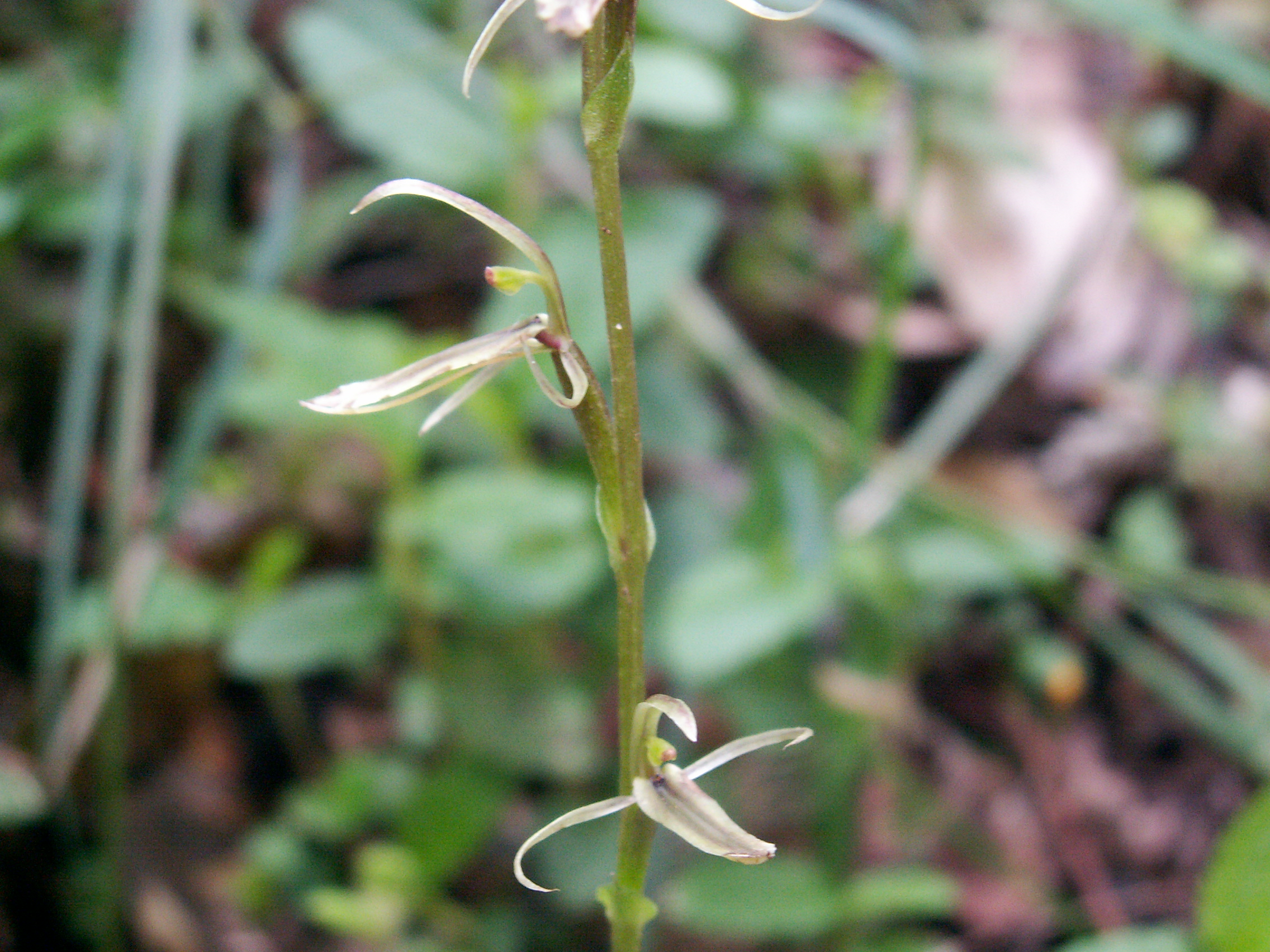
- Cyrtostylis huegelii near Mount Chudalup

Scientific classification
- Kingdom: Plantae
- Clade: Tracheophytes
- Clade: Angiosperms
- Clade: Monocots
- Order: Asparagales
- Family: Orchidaceae
- Subfamily: Orchidoideae
- Tribe: Diurideae
- Genus: Cyrtostylis
- Species: C. huegelii

Binomial name
- Cyrtostylis huegelii Endl.

Synonyms
- Caladenia reniformis var. huegelii (Endl.) Rchb.f.; Cyrtostylis reniformis var. huegelii (Endl.) Benth.; Acianthus huegelii (Endl.) Nicholls & Goadby; Acianthus reniformis var. huegelii (Endl.) A.S.George; Cyrtostylis reniformis var. huegelii (Endl.) Benth.

= Cyrtostylis huegelii =

Western gnat orchid

Species of orchid

Cyrtostylis huegelii, commonly known as the western common gnat orchid or midge orchid, is a species of orchid endemic to Western Australia. It usually has a single rounded leaf and a flowering spike with up to fifteen pale green and dull red flowers with a purplish, shelf-like labellum. Some authorities regard C. huegelii as a synonym of Cyrtostylis reniformis var. huegelii.

== Description ==
Cyrtostylis huegelii is a terrestrial, perennial, deciduous, herb with a single, almost round, ground-hugging leaf 30–70 mm (1–3 in) long and 20–50 mm (0.8–2 in) wide. Up to fifteen green and fawn-coloured or dull red flowers 10–20 mm (0.4–0.8 in) long and about 5 mm (0.2 in) wide are borne on a flowering stem 100–350 mm (4–10 in) high. The dorsal sepal is erect and curves forward, 10–14 mm (0.4–0.6 in) long and about 2 mm (0.08 in) wide. The lateral sepals are 8–11 mm (0.3–0.4 in) long, about 1 mm (0.04 in) wide and curve forwards or downwards. The petals are similar in size and shape to the lateral sepals and curve downwards. The labellum is purplish, shelf-like, tapered oblong, 8–11 mm (0.3–0.4 in) long and about 3 mm (0.12 in) wide with a pointed tip but lacking the serrations of the form found in eastern Australia. Flowering occurs from July to September.

== Taxonomy and naming ==
Cyrtostylis huegelii was first formally described in 1846 by Stephan Endlicher from a specimen collected on Rottnest Island. The description was published in J.G.C. Lehmann's Plantae Preissianae. The specific epithet (huegelii) honours Charles von Hügel who collected the type specimen.

Some authorities regard C. huegelii as a synonym of C. reniformis var. huegelii.

== Distribution and habitat ==
The western gnat orchid grows in shrubland, woodland and forest in wetter parts of the state and on granite outcrops in more inland areas. It is found from Kalbarri to Esperance.
