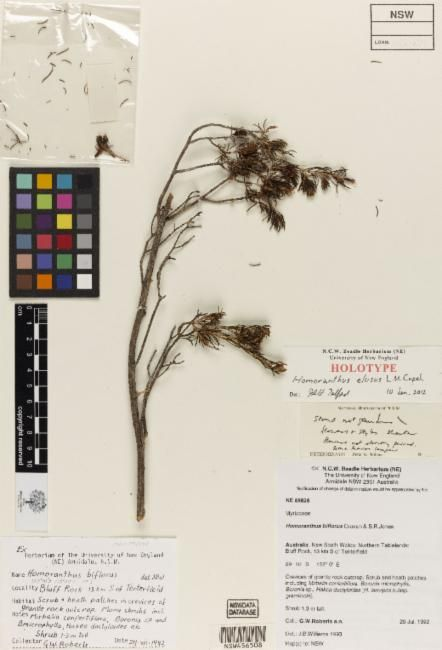
- Holotype in the University of New England

Scientific classification
- Kingdom: Plantae
- Clade: Tracheophytes
- Clade: Angiosperms
- Clade: Eudicots
- Clade: Rosids
- Order: Myrtales
- Family: Myrtaceae
- Genus: Homoranthus
- Species: H. elusus

Binomial name
- Homoranthus elusus L.M.Copel.

= Homoranthus elusus =

Species of flowering plant

Homoranthus elusus is a plant in the myrtle family Myrtaceae and is endemic to a small area on the Northern Tablelands of New South Wales. It is a shrub with linear leaves and with groups of up to four flowers in leaf axils. It is only known from a single specimen collected near Tenterfield.

== Description ==
An erect shrub with 2-4 flowers held erect in leaf axils at branchlet apex. Flowers in July and August.

== Taxonomy and naming ==
Homoranthus elusus was first formally described in 2011 by Lachlan Copeland, Lyndley Craven and Jeremy Bruhl from a specimen collected on Bluff Rock near Tenterfield in 2002 and the description was published in Australian Systematic Botany. The specific epithet (elusus) is a Latin word meaning "avoid", "evade", "frustrate" or "baffle", referring to the unsuccessful attempts by the authors to locate the species.

== Distribution and habitat ==
Known from a single collection from Bluff Rock south of Tenterfield New South Wales. May grow in scrub and heath patches.

== Conservation status ==
Known from a single specimen collected in 1992. Briggs and Leigh (1996) conservation code 1E. IUCN (2010) should be considered 'Critically Endangered'.
