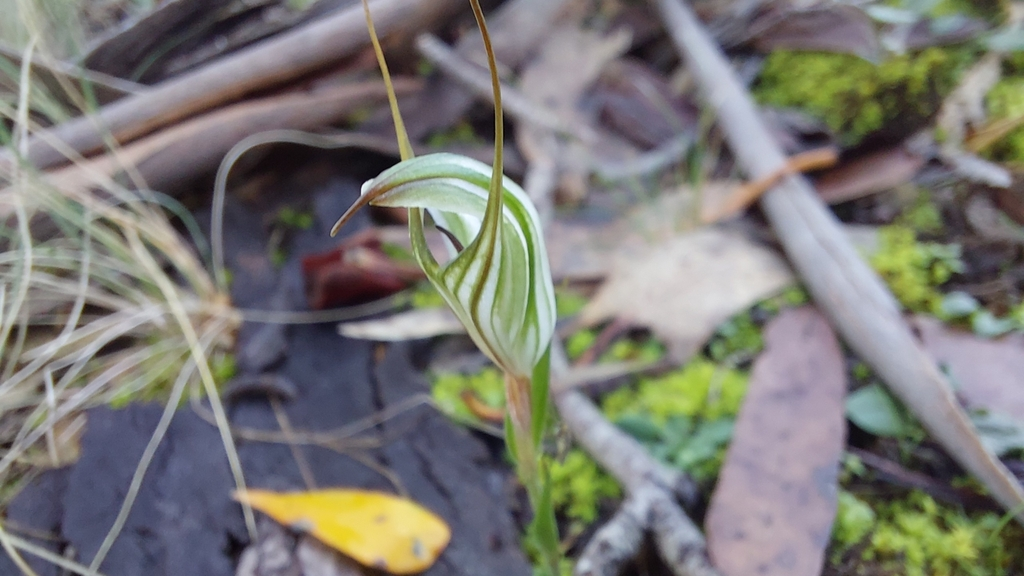
- Near Sandford

Scientific classification
- Kingdom: Plantae
- Clade: Embryophytes
- Clade: Tracheophytes
- Clade: Angiosperms
- Clade: Monocots
- Order: Asparagales
- Family: Orchidaceae
- Subfamily: Orchidoideae
- Tribe: Cranichideae
- Genus: Pterostylis
- Species: P. alata

Binomial name
- Pterostylis alata (Labill.) Rchb.f.

Synonyms
- List: Diplodium alatum (Labill.) Sw.; Diplodium alatum (Labill.) D.L.Jones & M.A.Clem. isonym; Diplodium australe Sw. nom. illeg., nom. superfl.; Disperis alata Labill.; Pterostylis alata (Labill.) Rchb.f. var. alata; Pterostylis praecox Lindl.; Pterostylis praecox Lindl. var. praecox; Pterostylis reflexa var. praecox (Lindl.) Ewart & Jean White

= Pterostylis alata =

Striped greenhood

Species of orchid

Pterostylis alata, commonly known as striped greenhood, is a species of orchid endemic to Tasmania. As with similar orchids, the flowering plants differ from those which are not flowering. The non-flowering plants have a rosette of leaves but the flowering plants have a single flower with leaves on the flowering spike. This greenhood has a white flower with prominent dark green stripes and a sharply pointed, brown-tipped dorsal sepal. Similar greenhoods growing on the Australian mainland were formerly known as Pterostylis alata but are now given the name Pterostylis striata.

== Description ==
Pterostylis alata is a terrestrial, perennial, deciduous, herb with an underground tuber and when not flowering, a rosette of dark green, wrinkled leaves, 4–20 mm (0.2–0.8 in) long and 3–12 mm (0.1–0.5 in) wide. Flowering plants have a single flower 17–21 mm (0.7–0.8 in) long and 6–7 mm (0.2–0.3 in) wide borne on a spike 80–250 mm (3–10 in) high. The flowers are white with dark green stripes. The dorsal sepal and petals are fused, forming a hood or "galea" over the column. The dorsal sepal curves forward with a narrow point 2–5 mm (0.08–0.2 in) long and is brownish near the tip. The lateral sepals are held closely against the galea, have erect, thread-like tips 23–27 mm (0.9–1 in) long and a broad V-shaped sinus between their bases. The labellum is 10–12 mm (0.4–0.5 in) long, about 3 mm (0.1 in) wide, brown and curved and protrudes above the sinus. Flowering occurs from May to August but mainly in June and July.

== Taxonomy and naming ==
The striped greenhood was first formally described in 1806 by Jacques Labillardière who gave it the name Disperis alata. (Disperis is a genus of orchid mainly from Africa and Madagascar.) Labillardière published the description in Novae Hollandiae Plantarum Specimen from a plant he collected "in Van-Diemen's Land". In 1871 Heinrich Reichenbach changed the name to Pterostylis alata. The specific epithet (alata) is a Latin word meaning "winged".

== Distribution and habitat ==
Pterostylis alata grows in open forest and coastal scrub in Tasmania. Pterostylis alata does not grow on the mainland of Australia and plants formerly placed in this species are now recognised as Pterostylis striata.
