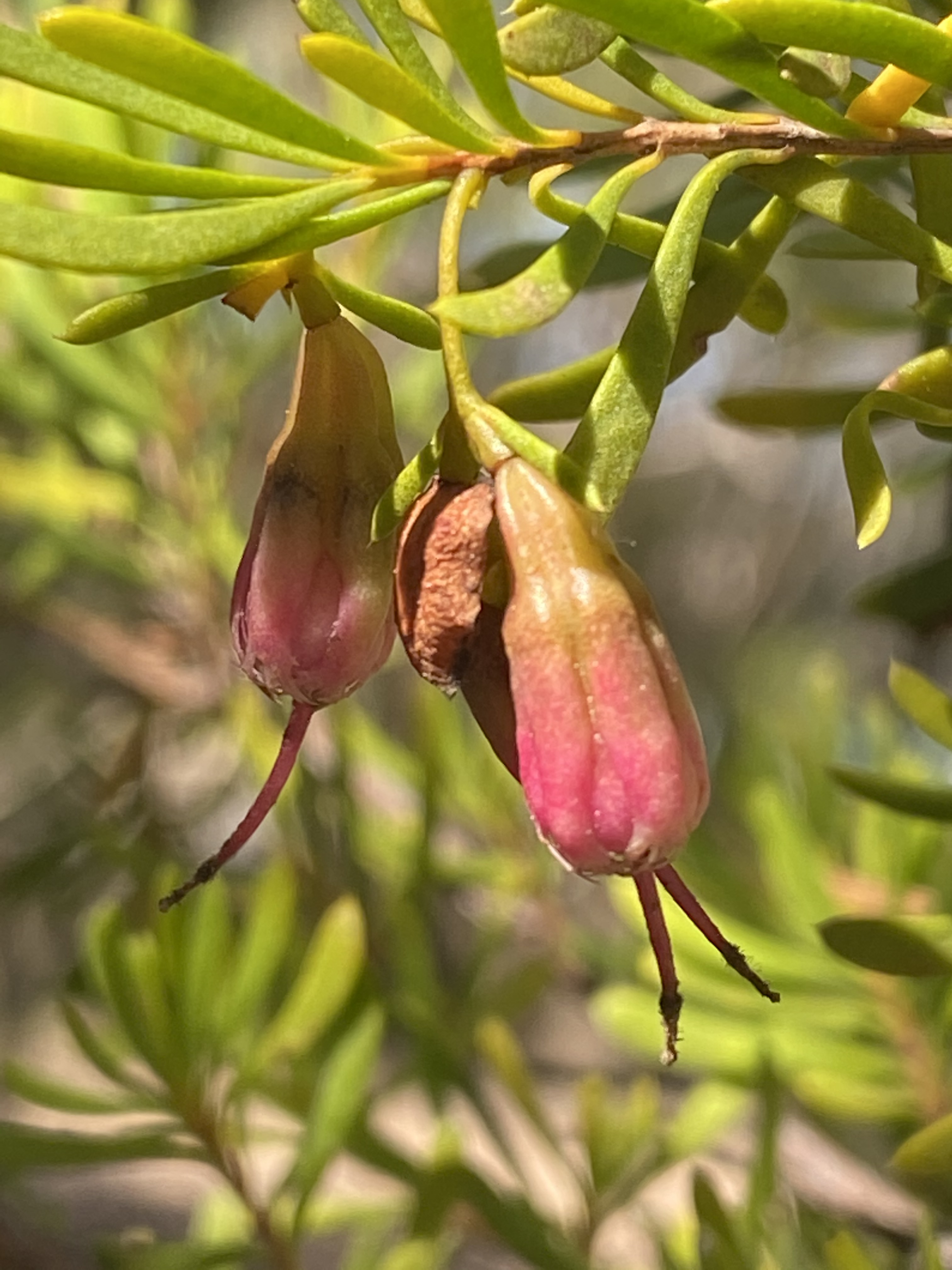

Scientific classification
- Kingdom: Plantae
- Clade: Tracheophytes
- Clade: Angiosperms
- Clade: Eudicots
- Clade: Rosids
- Order: Myrtales
- Family: Myrtaceae
- Genus: Homoranthus
- Species: H. clarksonii

Binomial name
- Homoranthus clarksonii L.M.Copel.
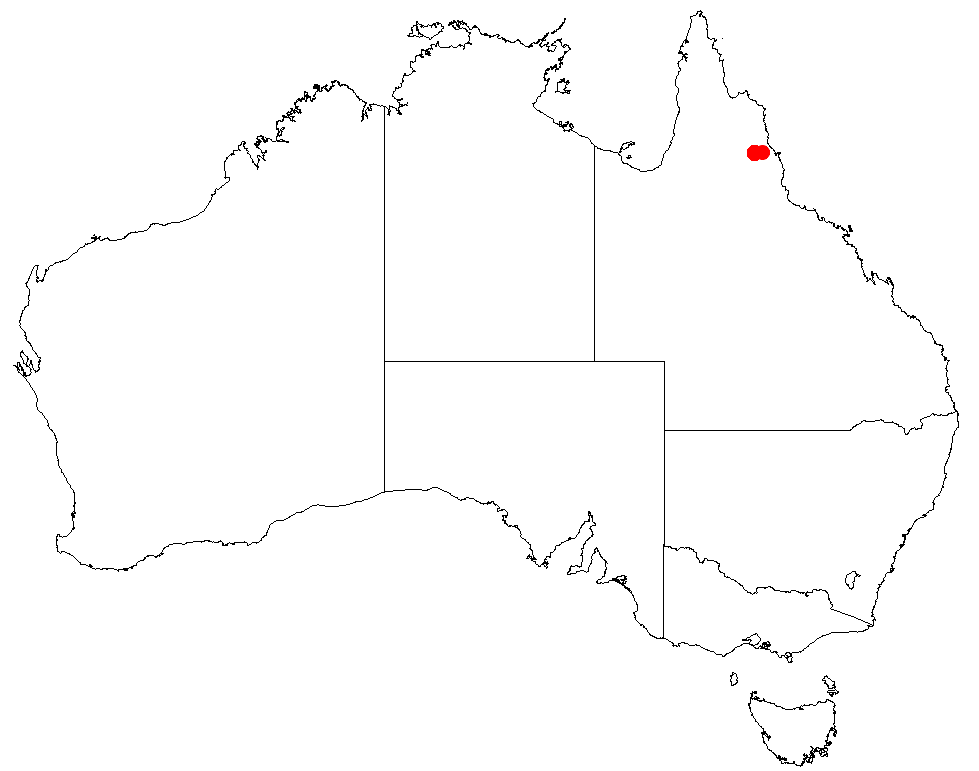
- Occurrence data from AVH

= Homoranthus clarksonii =

Species of flowering plant

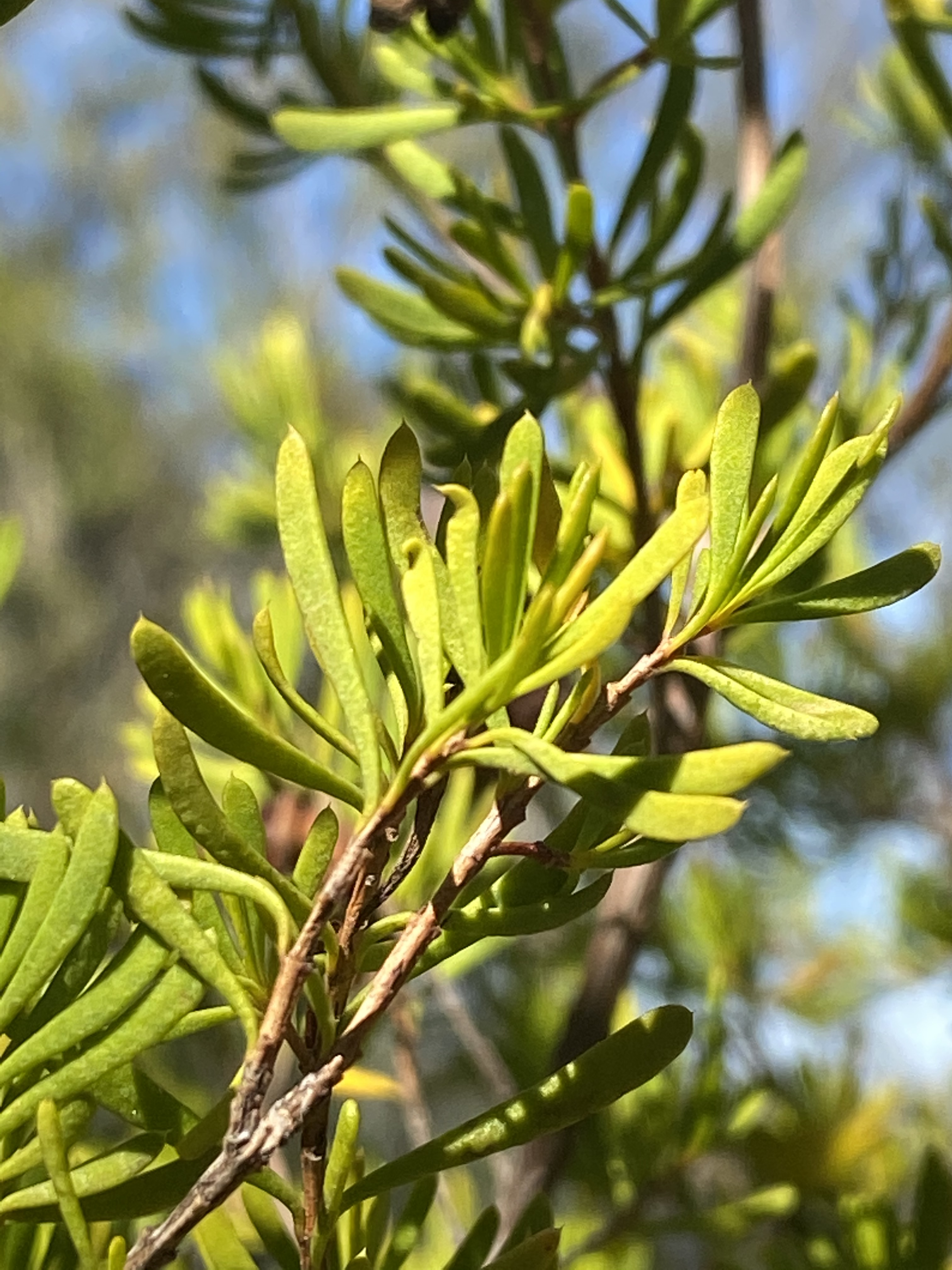
Foliage

Homoranthus clarksonii is a flowering plant in the family Myrtaceae and is endemic to a small area in Queensland. It is an upright shrub with pointed, linear leaves and pairs of creamy pink to pale yellow flowers which turn pink as they age. It is only known from small populations on Mount Mulligan.

== Description ==
Flowering occurs sporadically throughout the year, peak flowering from March to May.

== Taxonomy and naming ==
Homoranthus clarksonii was first formally described in 2011 by Lachlan Copeland, Lyndley Craven and Jeremy Bruhl from a specimen collected on Mount Mulligan in 2001 and the description was published in Australian Systematic Botany. The specific epithet (clarksonii) honours John Richard Clarkson who discovered the species.

== Distribution and habitat ==
Homoranthus clarksonii grows in shallow, sandy soils amongst sandstone boulders on the north western edge of Atherton Tablelands west of Mareeba.

== Conservation status ==
This homoranthus is restricted to Mount Mulligan. A ROTAP conservation code of 2V following Briggs and Leigh (1996). IUCN (2010) vulnerable.
