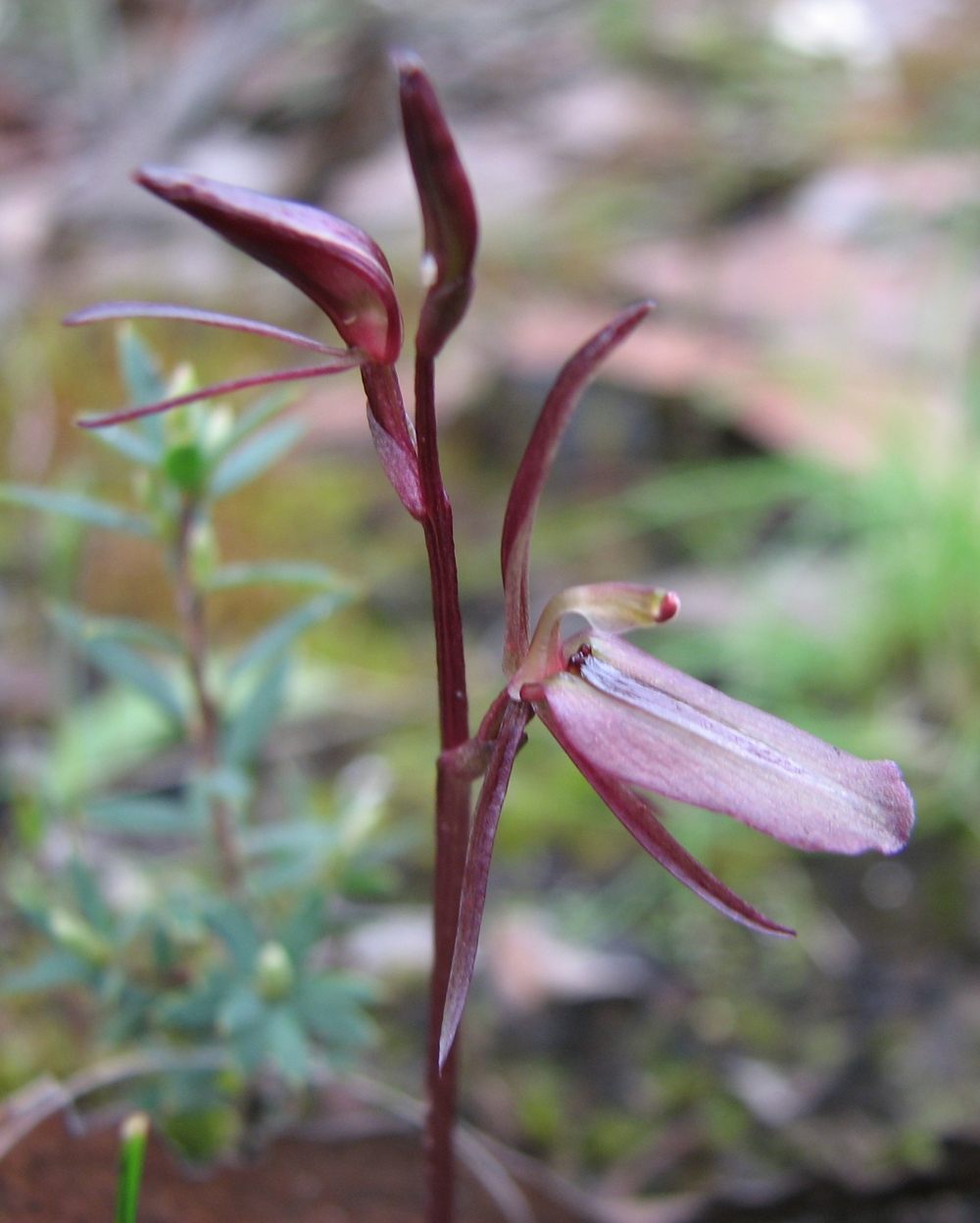
- The common gnat orchid, Cyrtostylis reniformis

Scientific classification
- Kingdom: Plantae
- Clade: Tracheophytes
- Clade: Angiosperms
- Clade: Monocots
- Order: Asparagales
- Family: Orchidaceae
- Subfamily: Orchidoideae
- Tribe: Diurideae
- Subtribe: Acianthinae
- Genus: Cyrtostylis; R.Br.
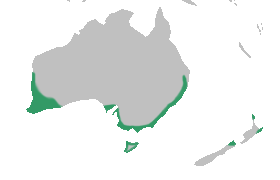
- Distribution

= Cyrtostylis =

Gnat orchids

Genus of plants

Cyrtostylis, commonly known as gnat orchids, is a genus of five or six species of flowering plants in the orchid family Orchidaceae and is native to Australia and New Zealand. Cyrtostylis orchids often form dense colonies of genetically identical plants. They have a single heart-shaped leaf and a thin flowering stem with pale coloured insect-like flowers. The lateral sepals and petals are similar in size and colour but the labellum is shelf-like and conspicuous with two prominent glands at its base.

== Description ==
Orchids in the genus Cyrtostylis are terrestrial, perennial, deciduous, sympodial herbs, usually with a few inconspicuous, fine roots and one or two tubers. They often form dense colonies of cloned plants. There is a single green, heart-shaped, ground-hugging leaf at the base of the flowering stem. The thin flowering stem bears one to a few flowers with the column at the top. The flowers are usually pale coloured with an erect dorsal sepal and spreading lateral sepals and petals. The petals and sepals are narrow lance-shaped and about as long as each other and the dorsal sepal. The labellum is stalkless, oblong and about as long as the sepals and petals with two bead-like glands and two ridges along its length. The column is curved with wings and is about half as long as the labellum.

Orchids in this genus are similar to those in Acianthus but lack the long appendage on the ends of the sepals and petals of that genus. The lateral sepals differ from the petals in Acianthus.

== Taxonomy and naming ==
The genus was first formally described in 1810 by Robert Brown in his Prodromus Florae Novae Hollandiae. He described Cyrtostylis reniformis at the same time, making it the type species.

The name Cyrtostylis is derived from the Greek words cyrtos meaning 'curved' and stylos, 'pertaining to the style', referring to the curved column found in all members of this genus.

The World Checklist of Selected Plant Families lists five species of Cyrtostlyis but Australian authorities list six. The difference lies in the interpretation of Cyrtostylis huegelii which the Checklist considers a synonym of Cyrtostylis reniformis var. huegelii.

- Cyrtostylis oblonga Hook.f. (New Zealand)
- Cyrtostylis reniformis R.Br - common gnat orchid (all 6 states of Australia)
- Cyrtostylis robusta D.L.Jones & M.A.Clem - large gnat orchid (S.A., W.A., Tas., Vic.)
- Cyrtostylis rotundifolia Hook.f. (New Zealand)
- Cyrtostylis tenuissima (Nicholls & Goadby) D.L.Jones & M.A.Clem. - dwarf gnat orchid (W.A.)
