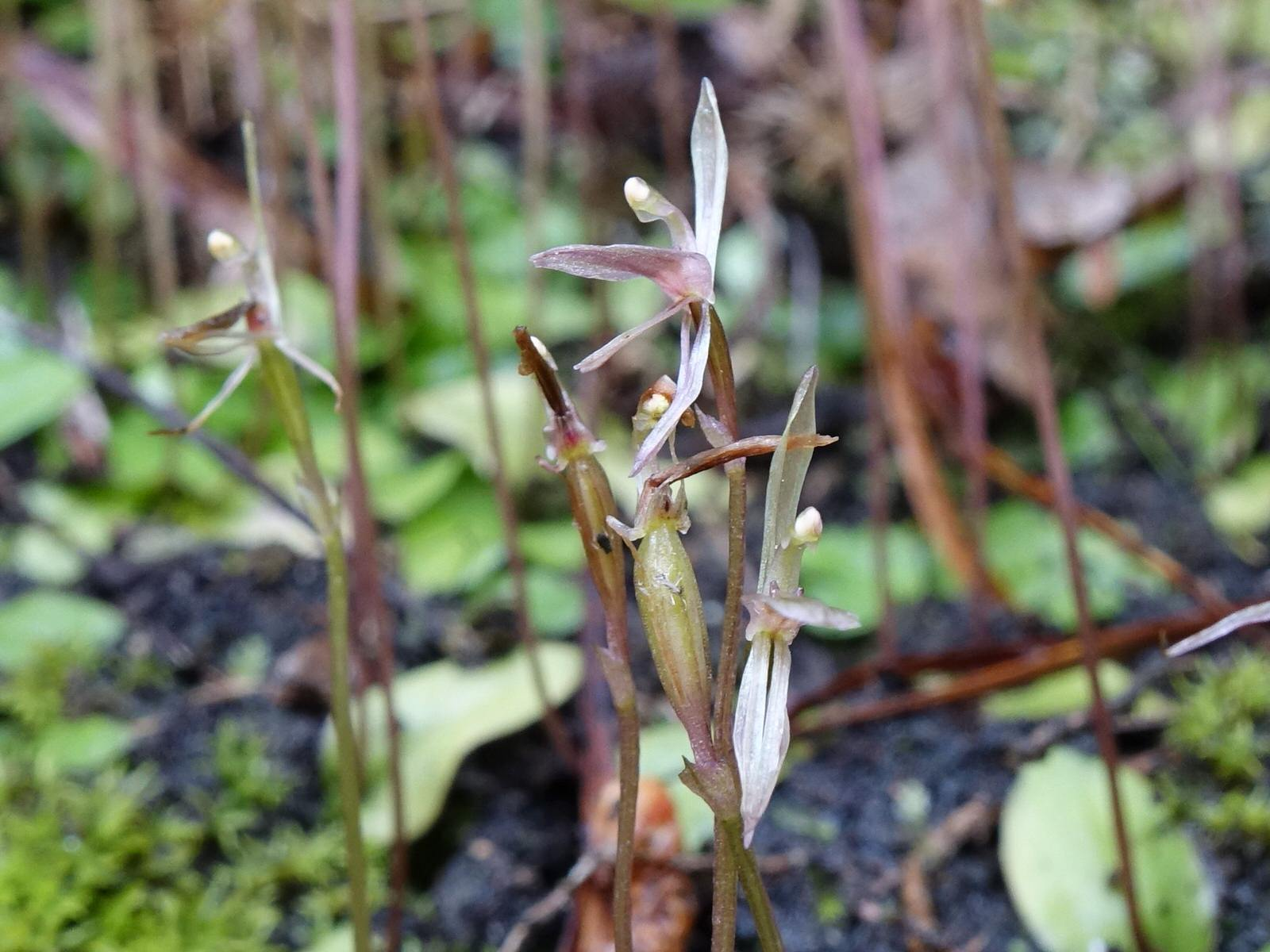
- On the Manukau Harbour shoreline of the Waitākere Ranges

Scientific classification
- Kingdom: Plantae
- Clade: Tracheophytes
- Clade: Angiosperms
- Clade: Monocots
- Order: Asparagales
- Family: Orchidaceae
- Subfamily: Orchidoideae
- Tribe: Diurideae
- Genus: Cyrtostylis
- Species: C. oblonga

Binomial name
- Cyrtostylis oblonga Hook.f.

Synonyms
- Acianthus oblonga (Hook.f.) Schltr.; Acianthus reniformis var. oblonga (Hook.f.) Rupp & Hatch; Caladenia oblonga (Hook.f.) Rchb.f.

= Cyrtostylis oblonga =

Winter orchid

Species of orchid

Cyrtostylis oblonga, commonly known as the winter orchid or gnat orchid, is a species of orchid endemic to New Zealand. It has a single rounded leaf and a flowering stem with up to four pink or pinkish green flowers with a flat, oblong labellum.

== Description ==
Cyrtostylis oblonga is a terrestrial, perennial, deciduous, herb with a single heart-shaped to almost round leaf 10–40 mm (0.4–2 in) long and 8–17 mm (0.3–0.7 in) wide. Up to four pink or pinkish green flowers 8–10 mm (0.3–0.4 in) long are borne on a thin flowering stem up to 100 mm (4 in) high. The dorsal sepal is erect, linear to narrow lance-shaped and the lateral sepals are narrow linear and somewhat smaller than the dorsal sepal. The petals are similar in size and shape to the lateral sepals. The labellum is flat, oval, about 10 mm (0.4 in) long 4 mm (0.16 in) wide with two round calli at the base and two parallel longitudinal ridges. The column is shorter than the labellum and has two wings widening towards the tip. Flowering occurs from July to November.

== Taxonomy and naming ==
Cyrtostylis oblonga was first formally described in 1853 by Joseph Dalton Hooker in Flora Novae-Zelandiae. The specific epithet (oblonga) is a Latin word meaning "longer than broad".

== Distribution and habitat ==
The winter orchid grows in scrub, forest and open areas on the northern part of the North Island and on Three Kings Islands in New Zealand.
