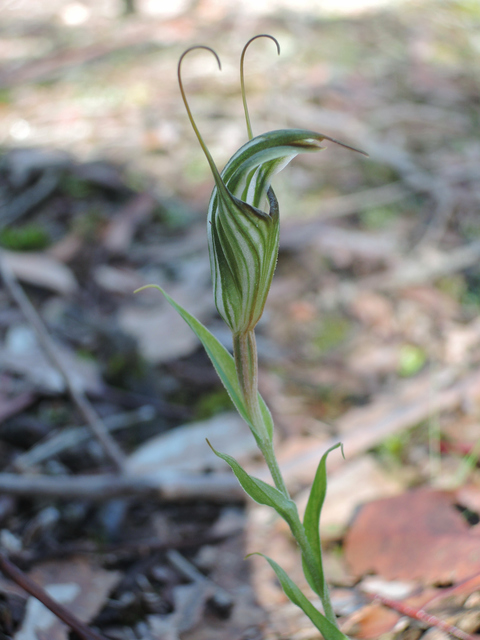
- Pterostylis striata growing in the Brisbane Ranges National Park

Scientific classification
- Kingdom: Plantae
- Clade: Tracheophytes
- Clade: Angiosperms
- Clade: Monocots
- Order: Asparagales
- Family: Orchidaceae
- Subfamily: Orchidoideae
- Tribe: Cranichideae
- Genus: Pterostylis
- Species: P. striata

Binomial name
- Pterostylis striata Fitzg.

Synonyms
- Diplodium nichollsianum D.L.Jones; Diplodium striatum (Fitzg.) D.L.Jones & M.A.Clem.; Pterostylis nichollsiana (D.L.Jones) D.L.Jones; Pterostylis reflexa var. intermedia Ewart; Pterostylis sp. aff. alata (Coastal); Pterostylis alata auct. non (Labill.) Rchb.f.; Pterostylis alata auct. non (Labill.) Rchb.f.

= Pterostylis striata =

Mainland striped greenhood

Species of orchid

Pterostylis striata, commonly known as the mainland striped greenhood, is a species of orchid endemic to south-eastern mainland Australia. As with similar orchids, the flowering plants differ from those which are not flowering. The non-flowering plants have a rosette of leaves but the flowering plants have a single flower with leaves on the flowering spike. This greenhood has a white flower with prominent dark green stripes and a brown-tipped dorsal sepal with a thread-like tip. Mainland striped greenhoods were formerly described as Pterostylis alata but that species is now recognised as a Tasmanian endemic.

== Description ==
Pterostylis striata is a terrestrial, perennial, deciduous, herb with an underground tuber and when not flowering, a rosette of between five and nine dark green, wrinkled leaves, 4–15 mm (0.2–0.6 in) long and 3–9 mm (0.1–0.4 in) wide. Flowering plants have a single flower 16–19 mm (0.6–0.7 in) long and 7–9 mm (0.3–0.4 in) wide borne on a spike 40–250 mm (2–10 in) high with three to five spreading stem leaves. The flowers are white with dark green stripes and a brownish tip. The dorsal sepal and petals are fused, forming a hood or "galea" over the column. The dorsal sepal curves forward with a thread-like tip 2–4 mm (0.08–0.2 in) long. The lateral sepals are held closely against the galea and have erect, thread-like tips 14–20 mm (0.6–0.8 in) long and a flat sinus with a small groove between their bases. The labellum is 7–9 mm (0.3–0.4 in) long, about 3 mm (0.1 in) wide, straight and just visible above the sinus. Flowering occurs from May to August.

== Taxonomy and naming ==
Pterostylis striata was first formally described in 1877 by Robert FitzGerald from a specimen found near Yass. Fitzgerald published the description in his book Australian Orchids. Plants in this species were formerly described as Pterostylis alata but that species is now recognised as a Tasmanian endemic. The State Herbarium of South Australia still lists Pterostylis alata as occurring in that state.

== Distribution and habitat ==
The mainland striped greenhood grows in a range of habitats from tea-tree scrub to forest and is widespread in Victoria. In New South Wales it is found south from Orange.
