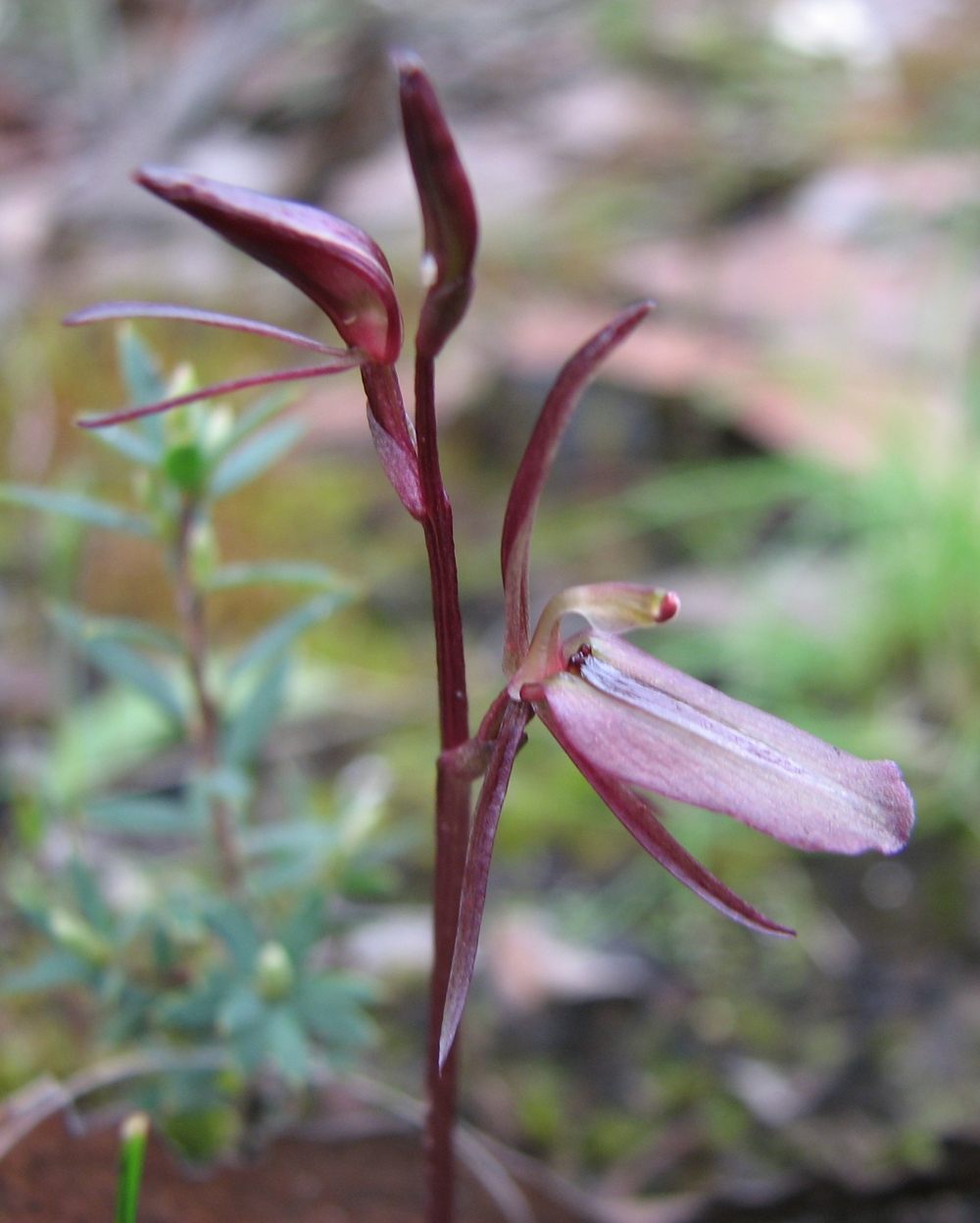
- In Brisbane Ranges National Park, Victoria

Scientific classification
- Kingdom: Plantae
- Clade: Embryophytes
- Clade: Tracheophytes
- Clade: Angiosperms
- Clade: Monocots
- Order: Asparagales
- Family: Orchidaceae
- Subfamily: Orchidoideae
- Tribe: Diurideae
- Genus: Cyrtostylis
- Species: C. reniformis

Binomial name
- Cyrtostylis reniformis R.Br.

Synonyms
- Acianthus reniformis (R.Br.) Schltr.; Acianthus reniformis (R.Br.) Schltr. var. reniformis; Caladenia reniformis (R.Br.) Rchb.f.; Cyrtostylis macrophylla Hook.f.; Cyrtostylis oblonga var. rotundifolia (Hook.f.) Cheeseman; Cyrtostylis reniformi G.N.Backh., R.J.Bates, A.P.Br. & L.M.Copel. orth. var.; Cyrtostylis reniformis R.Br. var. reniformis; Cyrtostylis rotundifolia Hook.f.

= Cyrtostylis reniformis =

Common gnat orchid

Species of orchid

Cyrtostylis reniformis, commonly known as common gnat-orchid, is a species of orchid endemic to eastern Australia. It usually has a single kidney-shaped leaf and a flowering spike with up to eight reddish flowers with a shelf-like labellum.

== Description ==
Cyrtostylis reniformis is a terrestrial, perennial, deciduous, herb with a single kidney-shaped, heart-shaped or almost round leaf 15–40 mm (0.6–2 in) long and 10–30 mm (0.4–1 in) wide. Up to eight dark reddish brown, or rarely yellowish flowers 11–14 mm (0.4–0.6 in) long are borne on a flowering stem 50–150 mm (2–6 in) high. The dorsal sepal is erect and curved forward, linear to lance-shaped, 11.5–13 mm (0.5–0.5 in) long and about 2 mm (0.08 in) wide. The lateral sepals are linear, 10–11 mm (0.4–0.4 in) long, about 1 mm (0.04 in) wide and curve forwards or downwards. The petals are similar in size and shape to the lateral sepals and curve downwards. The labellum is oblong, 10–12.5 mm (0.4–0.5 in) long and about 5 mm (0.20 in) wide and shelf-like with a few serrations near its pointed tip. Flowering occurs from May to October.

== Taxonomy and naming ==
Cyrtostylis reniformis was first formally described in 1810 by Robert Brown and the description was published in Prodromus Florae Novae Hollandiae et Insulae Van Diemen. The specific epithet (reniformis) means "kidney-shaped".

== Distribution and habitat ==
Common gnat-orchid is widespread and locally common in all Australian states and the Australian Capital Territory, except Western Australia.
