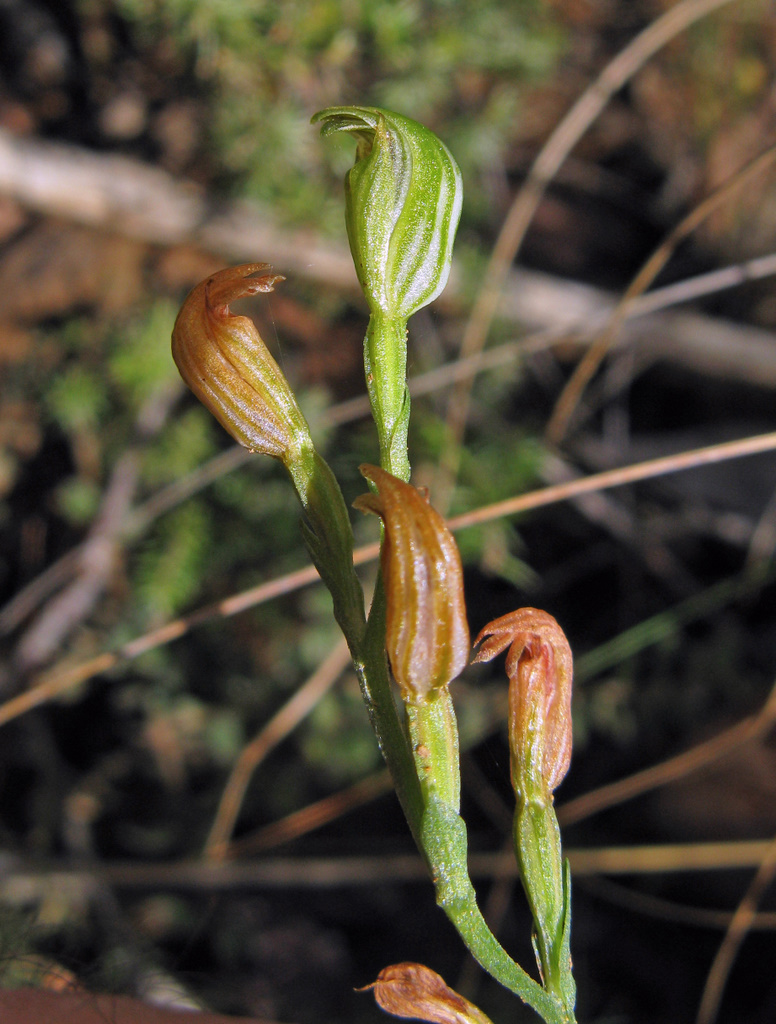
- Pterostylis parviflora growing in the Macedon Range

Scientific classification
- Kingdom: Plantae
- Clade: Tracheophytes
- Clade: Angiosperms
- Clade: Monocots
- Order: Asparagales
- Family: Orchidaceae
- Subfamily: Orchidoideae
- Tribe: Cranichideae
- Genus: Pterostylis
- Species: P. parviflora

Binomial name
- Pterostylis parviflora R.Br.

Synonyms
- Speculantha parviflora (R.Br.) D.L.Jones & M.A.Clem.

= Pterostylis parviflora =

Tiny greenhood

Species of orchid

Pterostylis parviflora, commonly known as the tiny greenhood, is a species of orchid endemic to south-eastern Australia. As with similar orchids, the flowering plants differ from those which are not flowering. The non-flowering plants have a rosette of leaves but the flowering plants lack a rosette at the base but have up to eight tiny green, white and brown flowers.

== Description ==
Pterostylis parviflora is a terrestrial, perennial, deciduous, herb with an underground tuber and when not flowering, a rosette of three to eight egg-shaped to heart-shaped leaves which lie flat on the ground. Each leaf is 3–15 mm long and 3–7 mm wide. Flowering plants have up to eight well-spaced flowers 7–10 mm long and 3–4 mm wide borne on a thin, wiry spike 80–250 mm high. Up to three leaf rosettes are arranged on the side of the flowering spike. The flowers are green and white, sometimes brown on the petals. The dorsal sepal and petals are fused, forming a hood or "galea" over the column. The dorsal sepal curves forward and has a short point. The lateral sepals are erect, held closely against the galea with thread-like tips about 3mm long that do not project above the galea. The sinus between the bases of the lateral sepals bulges forward and has a small notch in the centre. The labellum is about 4 mm long, 1.5 mm wide and barely visible above the sinus. Flowering occurs from February to May.

== Taxonomy and naming ==
Pterostylis parviflora was first formally described in 1810 by Robert Brown and the description was published in the Prodromus Florae Novae Hollandiae et Insulae Van Diemen.

== Distribution and habitat ==
The tiny greenhood grows in a range of habitats from coastal heath to forest in moist, well-drained soils. It is widespread on the coast and ranges of New South Wales, the Australian Capital Territory, Tasmania and most of Victoria. It also occurs in Queensland but is rare in South Australia.
