= Lachlan Mackenzie Copeland =

Australian botanist

- Born: 1973 (age 52–53)
- Scientific career
- Fields: Botany
- Author abbrev. (botany): L.M.Copel.

Lachlan Mackenzie Copeland (born 1973) is an Australian botanist, who obtained his PhD at the University of New England, with his thesis Systematic studies in Homoranthus (Myrtaceae: Chamelauciea).

The standard author abbreviation L.M.Copel. is used to indicate this person as the author when citing a botanical name.

In 2022, CSIRO published his Guide to Native Orchids of NSW and ACT, co-written with Gary N. Backhouse.

== Some publications ==
- (2005). Systematic studies in Homoranthus (Myrtaceae: Chamelauciea): / b species limits, Phylogenetic relationships and generic boundaries. 532 pp. Thesis, University of New England.
- Copeland, Lachlan M.; Craven, Lyn A.; Bruhl, Jeremy J. (2011). "A taxonomic review of Homoranthus (Myrtaceae: Chamelaucieae)". Australian Systematic Botany. 24 (6): 351. doi:10.1071/SB11015. ISSN 1030-1887.
- Copeland, Lachlan M.; Bruhl, Jeremy J.; Craven, Lyn A.; Brubaker, Curt L. (2007). "Phenetic analyses of Homoranthus (Myrtaceae: Chamelaucieae) on the basis of morphology". Australian Systematic Botany. 20 (5): 417. doi:10.1071/SB07012. ISSN 1030-1887.
- Copeland, Lachlan M.; Bruhl, Jeremy J.; Craven, Lyn A.; Brubaker, Curt L. (2008). "New chromosome numbers in Homoranthus (Myrtaceae: Chamelaucieae) and notes on their taxonomic utility". Australian Systematic Botany. 21 (6): 443. doi:10.1071/SB08036. ISSN 1030-1887.
- L. Jones, David & Copeland, Lachlan. (2018). "Six new species of Prasophyllum R.Br. in the Prasophyllum patens R.Br. / Prasophyllum odoratum R.S.Rogers complex from northern New South Wales." Australian Orchid Review. 83. 39-51.

== Taxa published ==
The Australian Plant Name index indicates that he has published 18 names.

Published names given by APNI (Australian Plant Name Index)

1. Homoranthus sp. Badgery Holding [Inglewood] (P.I.Forster 11633) L.M.Copel.
2. Homoranthus bebo L.M.Copel.
3. Homoranthus sp. Bebo State Forest (J.Westaway 1311) L.M.Copel.
4. Homoranthus sp. Blackdown Tableland National Park (S.Pearson 741) L.M.Copel.
5. Homoranthus sp. Bluff Rock (G.W.Roberts s.n. NSW 456508) L.M.Copel.
6. Homoranthus brevistylis L.M.Copel.
7. Homoranthus bruhlii L.M.Copel.
8. Homoranthus clarksonii L.M.Copel.
9. Homoranthus cummingii L.M.Copel.
10. Homoranthus elusus L.M.Copel.
11. Homoranthus sp. Mount Mulligan (J.R.Clarkson 5296) L.M.Copel.
12. Homoranthus sp. Tenterfield (L.M.Copeland 2715) L.M.Copel.
13. Homoranthus vagans L.M.Copel.
14. Plectranthus sp. Dorrigo (H.J.Wissmann NE 32603) L.M.Copel.
15. Plectranthus sp. Point Lookout (L.M.Copeland 1302) L.M.Copel.
16. Plectranthus sp. Torrington (C.E.Nano 460) L.M.Copel.
17. Prostanthera sp. Mt Marsh (L.M.Copeland 3770) L.M.Copel.
18. Prostanthera sp. Rowleys Creek (L.M.Copeland 4288) L.M.Copel.
