= Caladenia peisleyi =

Scientific classification
- Kingdom: Plantae
- Clade: Embryophytes
- Clade: Tracheophytes
- Clade: Spermatophytes
- Clade: Angiosperms
- Clade: Monocots
- Order: Asparagales
- Family: Orchidaceae
- Subfamily: Orchidoideae
- Tribe: Diurideae
- Genus: Caladenia
- Species: C. peisleyi

Binomial name
- Caladenia peisleyi (D.L.Jones) G.N.Backh.

Synonyms
- Arachnorchis peisleyi D.L.Jones

Species of orchid

Caladenia peisleyi is a plant in the orchid family Orchidaceae and is endemic to south-eastern Australia. It is a ground orchid with a single leaf and a single greenish-yellow flower with pale red stripes. It is difficult to distinguish from several other Caladenia species.

== Description ==
Caladenia peisleyi is a terrestrial, perennial, deciduous, herb with an underground tuber and a single leaf, 60–120 mm (2–5 in) long and 4–7 mm (0.2–0.3 in) wide. A single greenish-yellow flower with pale red stripes is borne on a spike 120–200 mm (5–8 in) tall. The sepals and petals have narrow, dark red, club-like glandular tips 5–12 mm (0.2–0.5 in) long. The sepals and petals are 20–35 mm (0.8–1 in) long and 1.5–3 mm (0.06–0.1 in) wide with the petals shorter than the sepals. The sepals and petals taper to thin, thread-like tips. The sepals have dark reddish, club-like, glandular tips 3–6 mm (0.1–0.2 in) long. The labellum is greenish-cream with pale reddish stripes and is 11–13 mm (0.4–0.5 in) long and 7–9 mm (0.28–0.35 in) wide. The sides of the labellum have short triangular teeth up to 0.5 mm (0.02 in) long, decreasing in size towards the tip. There are four rows of calli up to 1.5 mm (0.06 in) long in the mid-line, near the base of the labellum. Flowering occurs in September and October. This caladenia is similar to and difficult to distinguish from C. oreophila, C. montana, C. osmera, C. australis and C. fitzgeraldii which occur in similar areas.

== Taxonomy and naming ==
This orchid was first formally described in 2006 by David Jones and given the name Arachnorchis peisleyi. The description was published in Australian Orchid Research. In 2007 Gary Backhouse changed the name to Caladenia peisleyi. The specific epithet (peisleyi) honours Allan Bertrand Peisley, an Australian orchidologist.

== Distribution and habitat ==
Caladenia peisleyi is only known from East Gippsland where it grows in heath and heathy forest. It probably also occurs on the south coast of New South Wales.

== Conservation ==
Caladenia peisleyi is listed as "vulnerable" under the Victorian Flora and Fauna Guarantee Act 1988.
