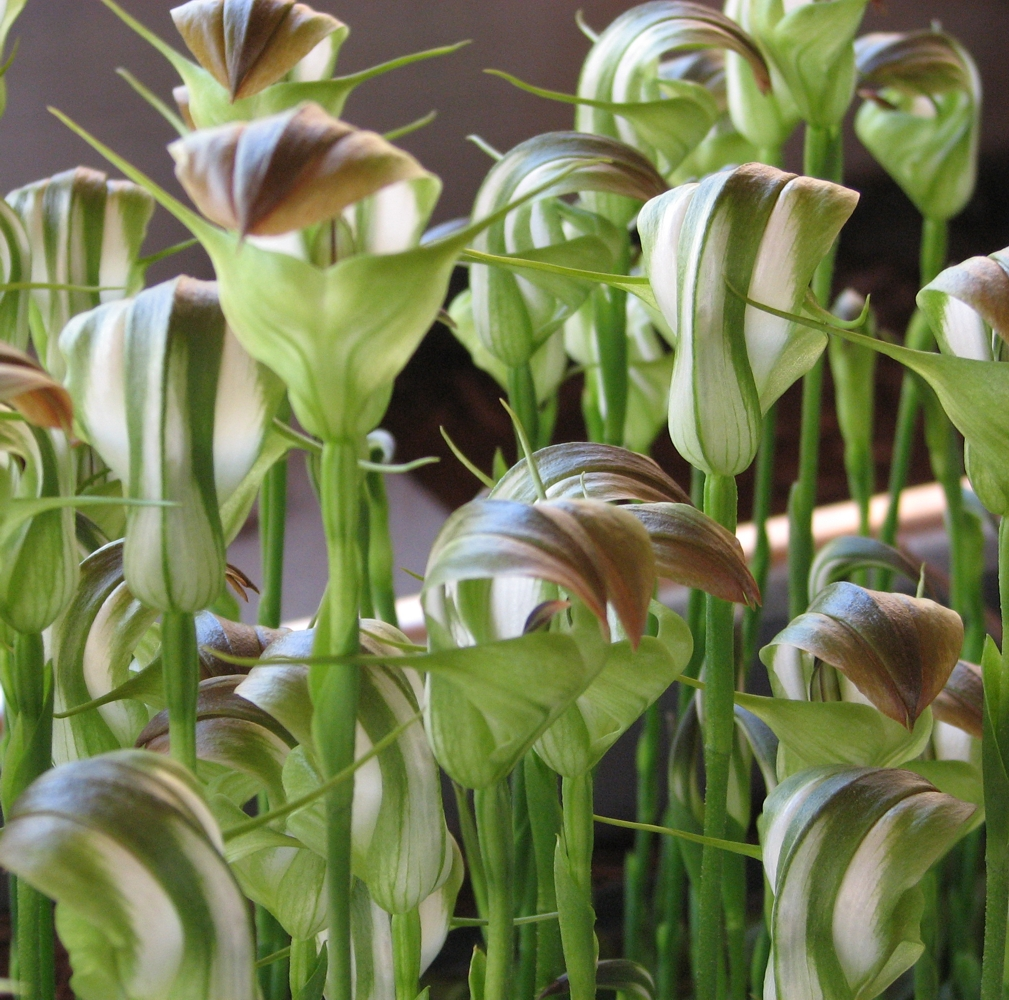
- In the Royal Botanic Gardens, Cranbourne

Scientific classification
- Kingdom: Plantae
- Clade: Embryophytes
- Clade: Tracheophytes
- Clade: Spermatophytes
- Clade: Angiosperms
- Clade: Monocots
- Order: Asparagales
- Family: Orchidaceae
- Subfamily: Orchidoideae
- Tribe: Cranichideae
- Genus: Pterostylis
- Species: P. baptistii

Binomial name
- Pterostylis baptistii Fitzg.

Synonyms
- Pterostylis curta var. grandiflora Benth.

= Pterostylis baptistii =

King greenhood

Species of orchid

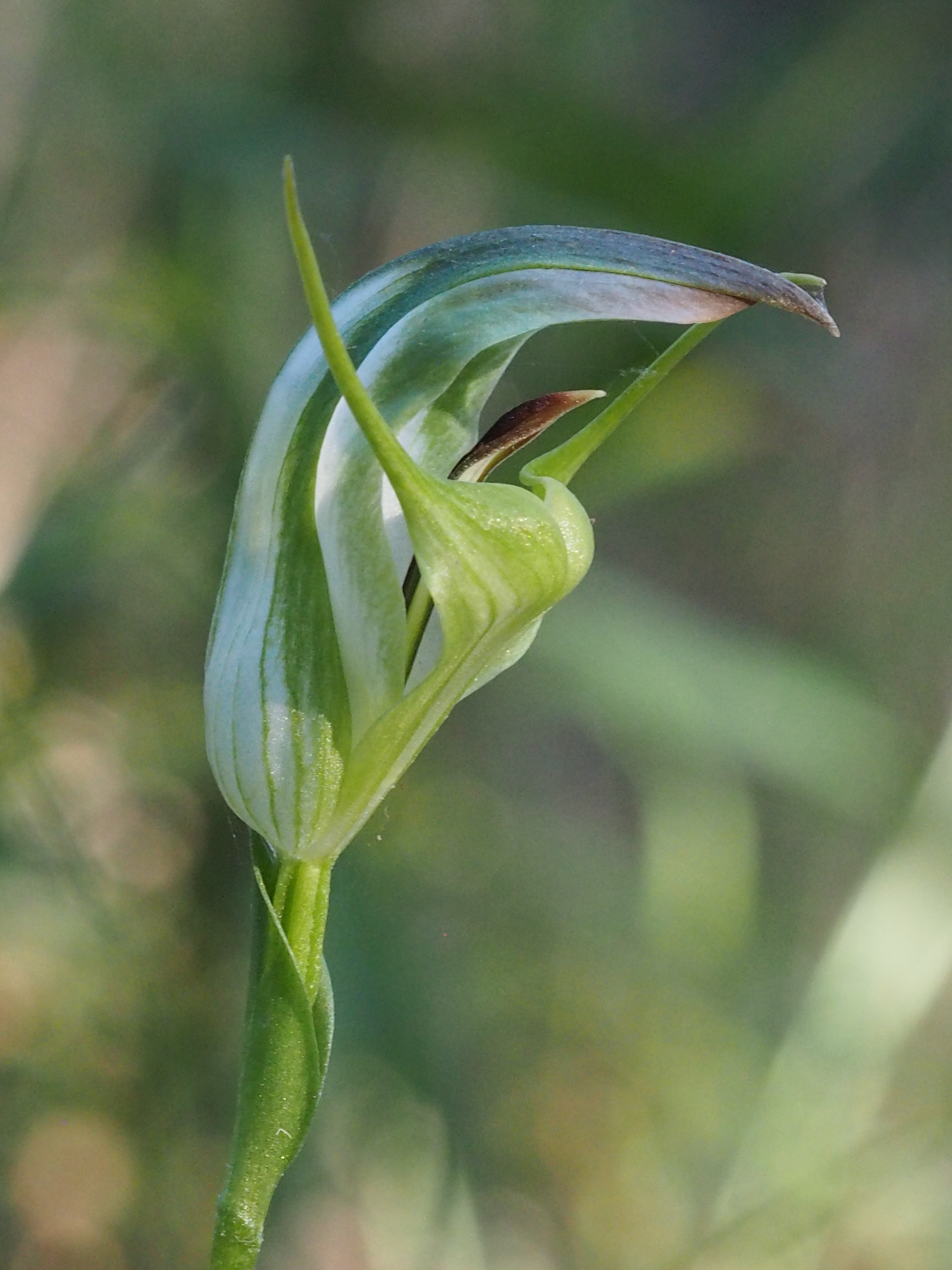
In Bongil Bongil National Park

Pterostylis baptistii, commonly known as the king greenhood, is a species of orchid endemic to eastern Australia. Flowering plants have a rosette of stalked, dark green leaves and a single white flower with green and brown markings, and a wide gap between the petals and lateral sepals. It occurs mostly in New South Wales but is also found in coastal Queensland and north-eastern Victoria.

== Description ==
Pterostylis baptistii is a terrestrial, perennial, deciduous, herb with an underground tuber. Flowering plants have a rosette of between four and eight stalked, dark green leaves, each leaf 30–80 mm long and 20–25 mm wide. A single flower 40–60 mm long and 20–30 mm wide is borne on a spike 200–400 mm high. The flowers are white with green and brown markings. The dorsal sepal and petals are fused, forming a hood or "galea" over the column. The dorsal sepal curves forward with a sharp tip and is the same length as the petals. There is a wide gap between the petals and the lateral sepals which have swept-back, thread-like tips 25–35 mm long. The sinus between the lateral sepals is almost flat with a central notch and bulges forward. The labellum is 18–22 mm long, 5–6 mm wide, reddish brown and protrudes above the sinus. Flowering mainly occurs from July to November.

== Taxonomy and naming ==
Pterostylis baptistii was first formally described in 1875 by Robert FitzGerald from a specimen collected near Hen and Chicken Bay in Sydney. The description was published in Fitzgerald's book Australian Orchids. The specific epithet (baptistii) refers to Baptist Gardens, a nursery in Surry Hills who sent the type specimen to Fitzgerald.

== Distribution and habitat ==
The king greenhood grows mainly in coastal areas from southern Queensland through New South Wales to north-eastern Victoria and grows in moist to wet soils on sheltered slopes in forest and near swamps.

== Conservation ==
Pterostylis baptistii is classified as "vulnerable" under the Victorian Government Flora and Fauna Guarantee Act 1988.
