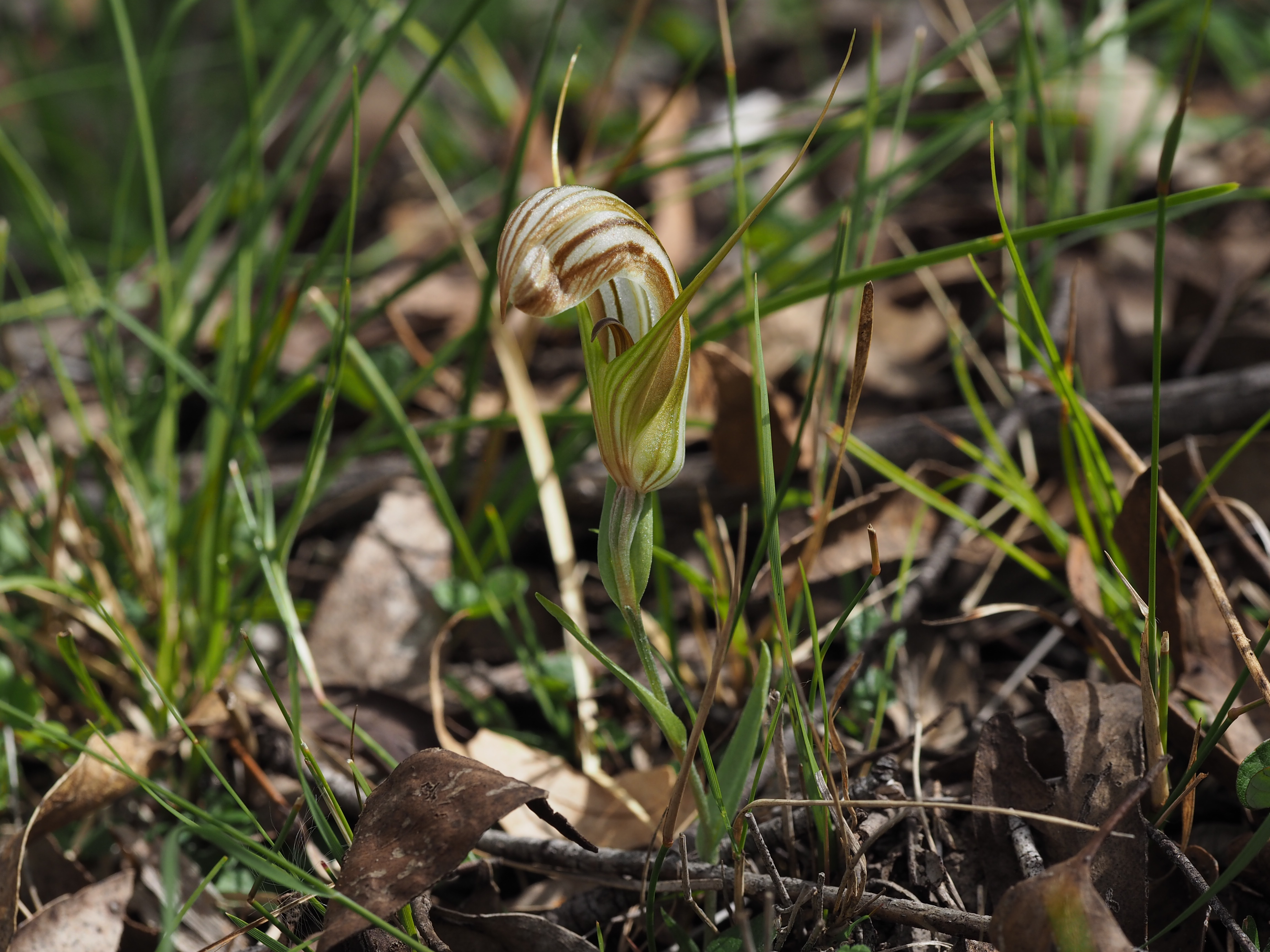
- Pterostylis truncata growing near Armidale

Scientific classification
- Kingdom: Plantae
- Clade: Tracheophytes
- Clade: Angiosperms
- Clade: Monocots
- Order: Asparagales
- Family: Orchidaceae
- Subfamily: Orchidoideae
- Tribe: Cranichideae
- Genus: Pterostylis
- Species: P. truncata

Binomial name
- Pterostylis truncata Fitzg.

Synonyms
- Diplodium truncatum (Fitzg.) D.L.Jones & M.A.Clem.

= Pterostylis truncata =

Brittle greenhood

Species of orchid

Pterostylis truncata, commonly known as the brittle greenhood or little dumpies, is a species of orchid endemic to eastern Australia. It is easily distinguished from other greenhood orchids by its short habit and relatively large, "dumpy", green, white and brown flowers. It is widespread and common in New South Wales and the Australian Capital Territory but is classed as "endangered" in Victoria due to habitat loss as a result of urbanisation.

== Description ==
When not flowering, Pterostylis truncata has a rosette of between two and six bright green, egg-shaped to lance-shaped leaves, each leaf 10–35 mm (0.4–1 in) long and 5–18 mm (0.2–0.7 in) wide. When it flowers it produces a single white flower with green and brown stripes, borne on a spike 50–150 mm (2–6 in) high. There are between two and five stem leaves closely wrapped around the flowering spike. The flowers are 35–45 mm (1–2 in) long, 7–20 mm (0.3–0.8 in) wide and inflated, leaning forward with a downturned tip. The dorsal sepal has a sharp point and the petals turn inwards underneath it. The lateral sepals have a deep V-shaped sinus between them and each sepal has a thread-like tip 25–30 mm (0.98–1.2 in) long.

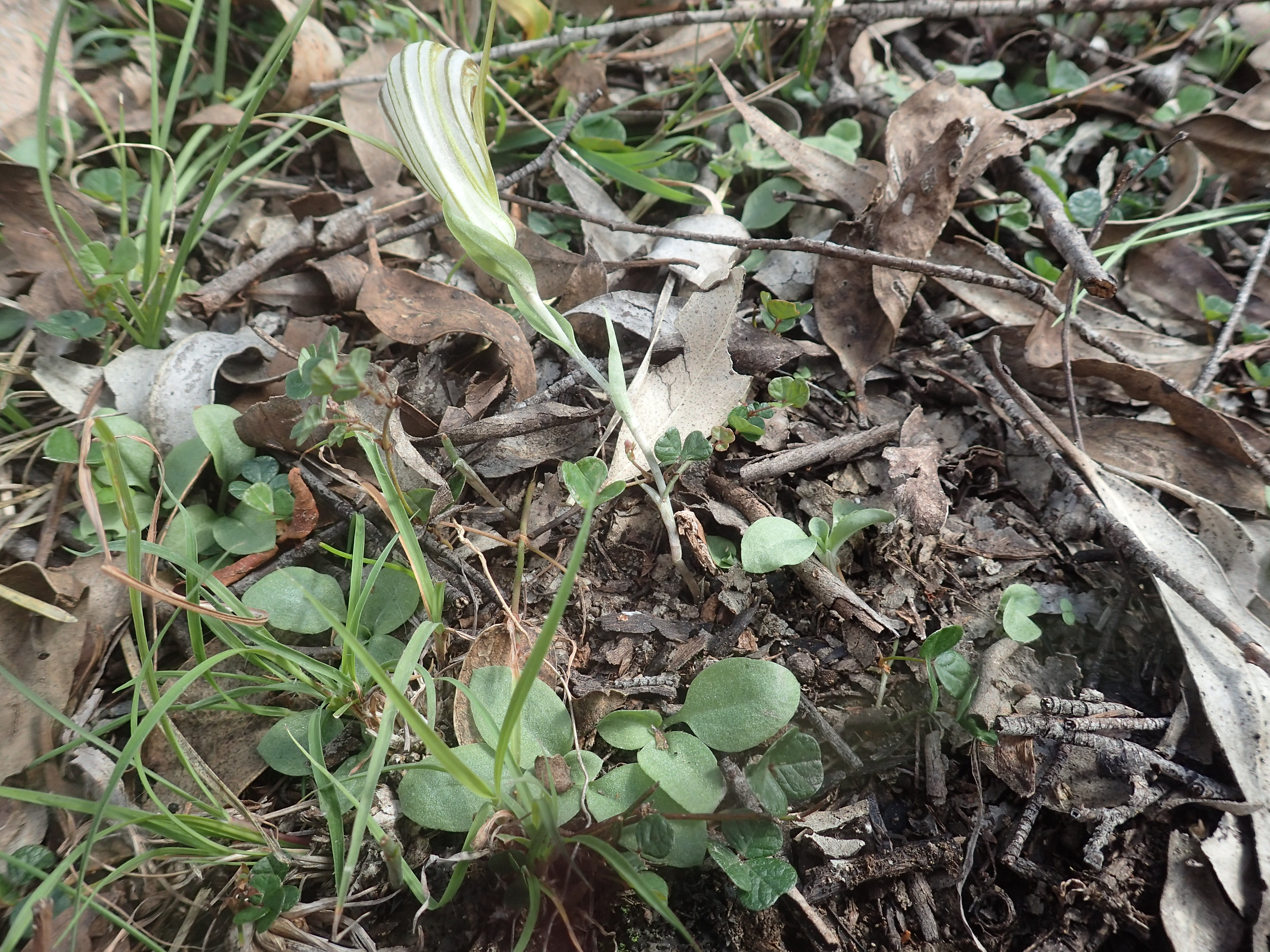
Pterostylis truncata leaf rosette

== Taxonomy and naming ==
Pterostylis truncata was first described in 1878 by Robert FitzGerald from a specimen collected near Mittagong and the description was published in Fitzgerald's book Australian Orchids. The specific epithet (truncata) is a Latin word meaning "to maim or shorten by cutting off".

== Distribution and habitat ==
The brittle greenhood is widespread and common in New South Wales, and the Australian Capital Territory where it grows in forest, often on sheltered ridges and slopes south from the New England Tableland. It is rare in Victoria where it grows in well-drained soil in grassland, woodland or on granite outcrops within 100 km (60 mi) of Melbourne.

== Conservation ==
Pterostylis truncata is classed as "endangered" under the Victorian Government Flora and Fauna Guarantee Act 1988. Populations are only known from the You Yangs, Black Hill Reserve near Ballarat and the Long Forest Nature Conservation Reserve near Bacchus Marsh although the range of the orchid was once considerably larger. The main threats to the species and factors in its decline in Victoria, include grazing by European rabbits (Oryctolagus cuniculus), feral goats (Capra hircus) and eastern grey kangaroos (Macropus giganteus), as well as weed invasion, especially boneseed (Chrysanthemoides monilifera) and habitat loss due to urbanisation.

== Gallery ==
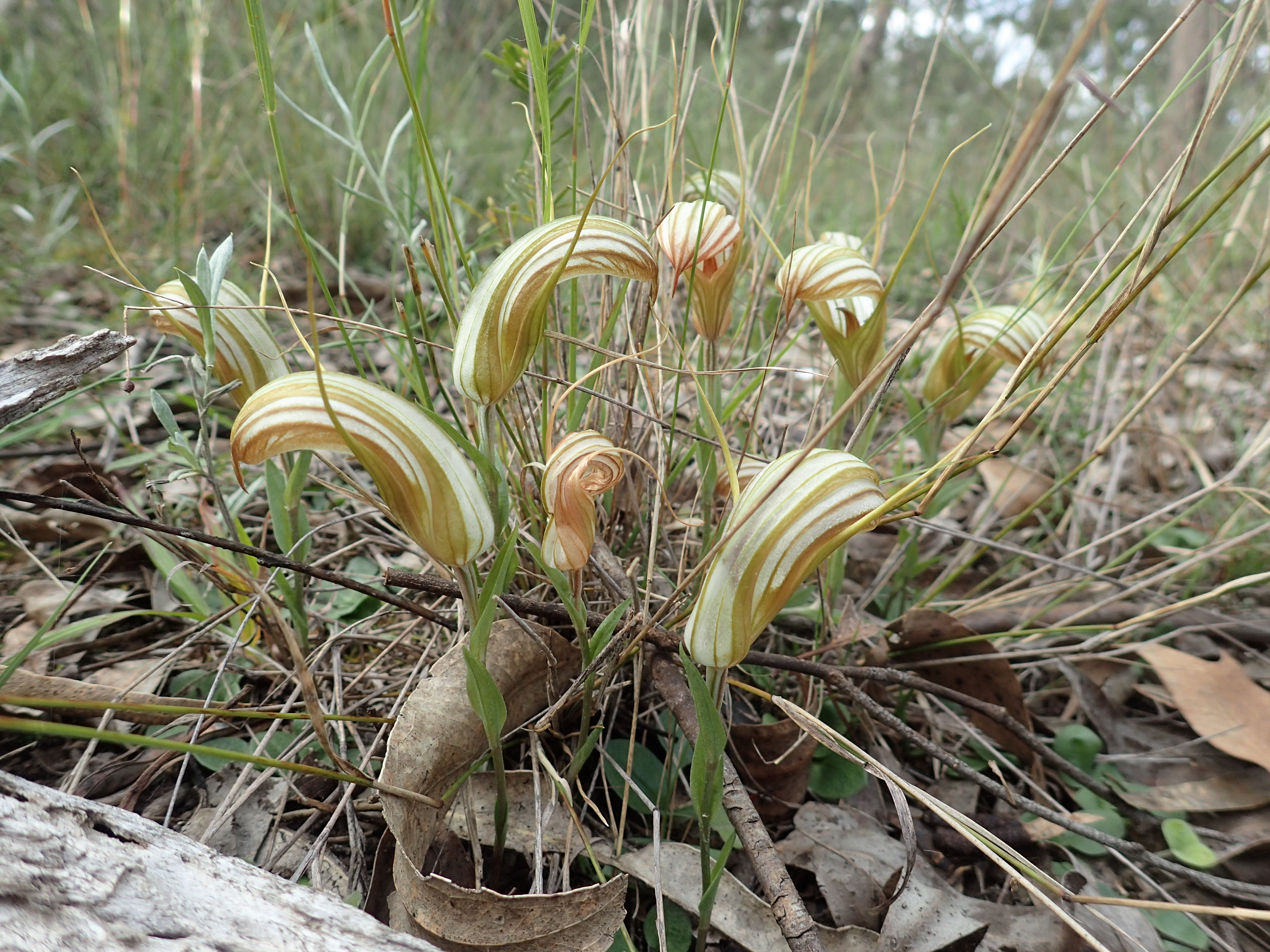
Clump of Pterostylis truncata near Dangars Falls

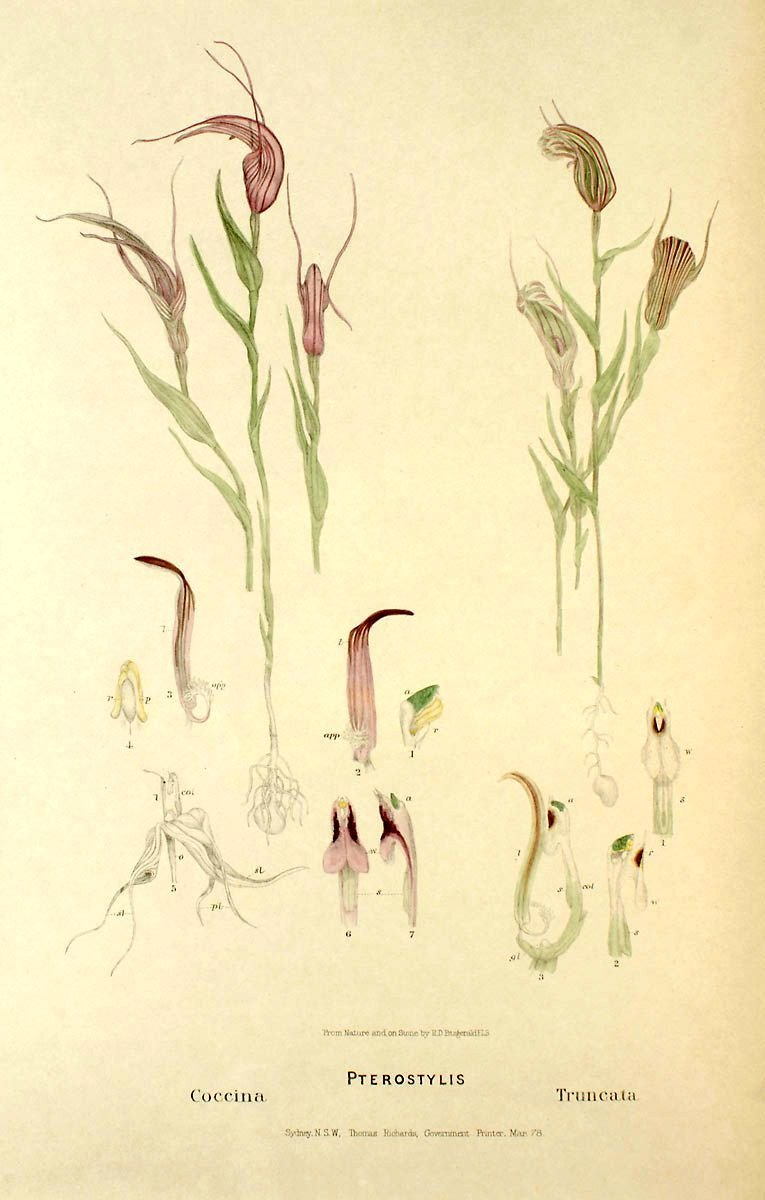
Fitzgerald's painting of P. coccina (L) and P. truncata (R)
