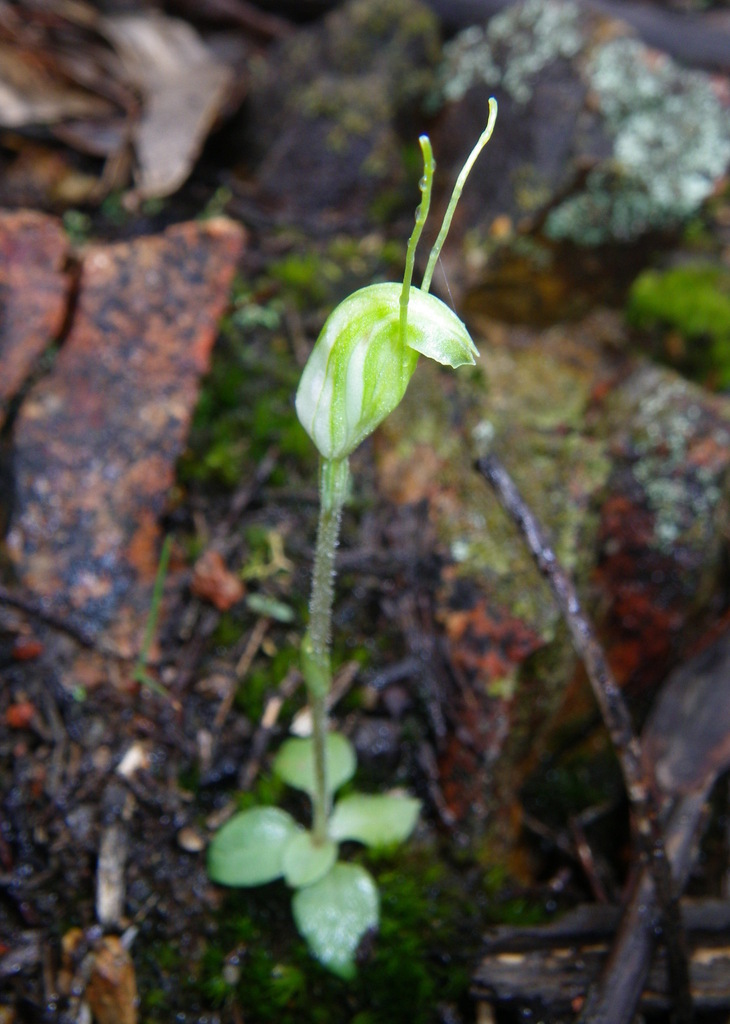

Scientific classification
- Kingdom: Plantae
- Clade: Tracheophytes
- Clade: Angiosperms
- Clade: Monocots
- Order: Asparagales
- Family: Orchidaceae
- Subfamily: Orchidoideae
- Tribe: Cranichideae
- Genus: Pterostylis
- Species: P. clavigera

Binomial name
- Pterostylis clavigera Fitzg.

Synonyms
- Diplodium clavigerum (Fitzg.) D.L.Jones & M.A.Clem.; Linguella clavigera (Fitzg.) D.L.Jones & M.A.Clem.

= Pterostylis clavigera =

Hairy snail orchid

Species of orchid

Pterostylis clavigera, commonly known as hairy snail orchid, is a species of orchid which is endemic to New South Wales. It has a rosette of leaves at its base, and when flowering, a single narrow, bright green and white flower on a rough flowering stem.

== Description ==
Pterostylis clavigera is a terrestrial, perennial, deciduous, herb with an underground tuber and a rosette of dull green leaves 7–17 mm (0.3–0.7 in) long and 5–10 mm (0.2–0.4 in) wide with wavy edges. A single bright green and white flower, 11–17 mm (0.4–0.7 in) long and 4–7 mm (0.2–0.3 in) wide is borne on a flowering stem 50–150 mm (2–6 in) high and covered with short hairs. The dorsal sepal and petals are fused, forming a hood or "galea" over the column, the sepal and petals with a short, nearly horizontal point on the end. The lateral sepals are erect, in close contact with the galea and have thread-like tips 10–15 mm (0.4–0.6 in) long. The lateral sepals almost close off the front of the flower and the sinus between them has a dark green central area. The labellum is 3–5 mm (0.1–0.2 in) long, 1–2 mm (0.04–0.08 in) wide and hidden inside the flower. Flowering occurs from June to September.

== Taxonomy and naming ==
Pterostylis clavigera was first formally described in 1885 by Robert D. FitzGerald and the description was published in Journal of Botany, British and Foreign. The specific epithet (clavigera) is a Latin word meaning "club-bearing".

== Distribution and habitat ==
Hairy snail orchid grows in shrubland, woodland and rocky slopes between Mudgee and Dubbo and in nearby areas.
