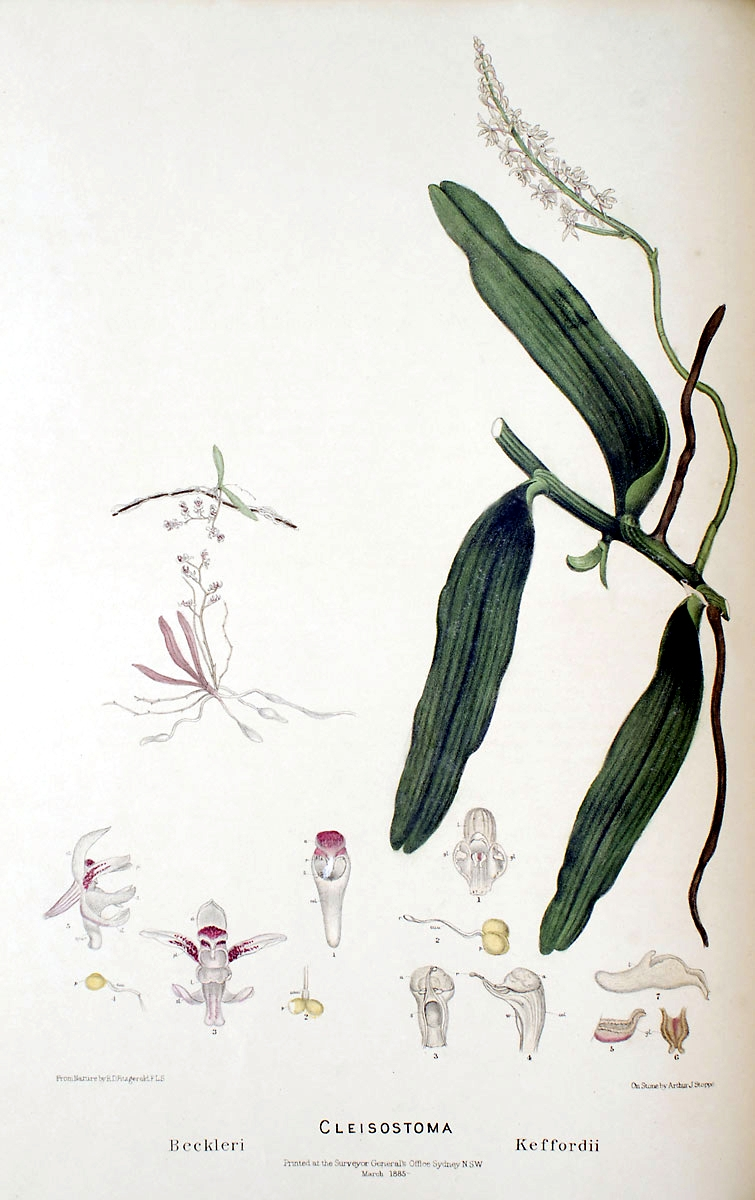
- Illustration from Robert D. FitzGerald#Australian Orchids

Scientific classification
- Kingdom: Plantae
- Clade: Tracheophytes
- Clade: Angiosperms
- Clade: Monocots
- Order: Asparagales
- Family: Orchidaceae
- Subfamily: Epidendroideae
- Tribe: Vandeae
- Subtribe: Aeridinae
- Genus: Papillilabium; Dockrill
- Species: P. beckleri

Binomial name
- Papillilabium beckleri (F.Muell. ex Benth.) Dockrill

Synonyms
- Cleisostoma beckleri F.Muell. ex Benth.; Sarcochilus beckleri (F.Muell. ex Benth.) F.Muell.; Sarcanthus beckleri (F.Muell. ex Benth.) Rupp; Saccolabium virgatum T.E.Hunt

= Papillilabium =

Imp orchid

Genus of orchids

Papillilabium beckleri, commonly known as the imp orchid, is the only species in the genus Papillilabium from the orchid family, Orchidaceae. It is a small, epiphytic orchid with many thin roots, between two and six linear leaves and up to eight pale green or brownish flowers. The flowers are fragrant, produce nectar and have a warty labellum. It grows on shrubs and trees in humid places and near streams and is found between south-east Queensland and the Sydney region in New South Wales.

== Description ==
Papillilabium beckleri is an epiphytic herb with many thin, wiry roots, a single shoot and stems 10–40 millimetres (0.39–1.6 in) long. Each stem has between two and six linear to lance-shaped, leaves 30–50 millimetres (1.2–2.0 in) long and 2–4.5 millimetres (0.079–0.18 in) wide, often with pink or purple spots. Up to eight pale green or brownish flowers 7–8 millimetres (0.28–0.31 in) long and 4–6 millimetres (0.16–0.24 in) wide, sometimes with purple markings, are borne on flowering stems 15–40 millimetres (0.59–1.6 in) long. The sepals and petals spread widely apart from each other, the sepals about 3 millimetres (0.12 in) long and 1 millimetre (0.039 in) wide, the petals slightly narrower. The labellum is white, green or yellowish, sometimes with purple markings, about 4 millimetres (0.16 in) long, 3 millimetres (0.12 in) wide with three lobes. The side lobes are long and narrow and the middle lobe is warty with a spur 2 millimetres (0.079 in) long. Flowering occurs from September to October.

== Taxonomy and naming ==
The imp orchid was first formally described in 1873 by George Bentham from an unpublished description by Ferdinand von Mueller. Bentham gave it the name Cleisostoma beckleri and published the description in Flora Australiensis from a specimen collected by Hermann Beckler near the Clarence River. In 1967, Alick Dockrill changed the name to Papillilabium beckleri. The name Papillilabium is derived from the Latin words papilla meaning "nipple", "teat"or "bud" and labium meaning "lip". The specific epithet honours the collector of the type specimen.

== Distribution and habitat ==
Papillilabium beckleri grows on shrubs and trees in humid places and near streams and is found between Mapleton in Queensland and the Royal National Park in New South Wales.

== See also ==
- List of Orchidaceae genera
