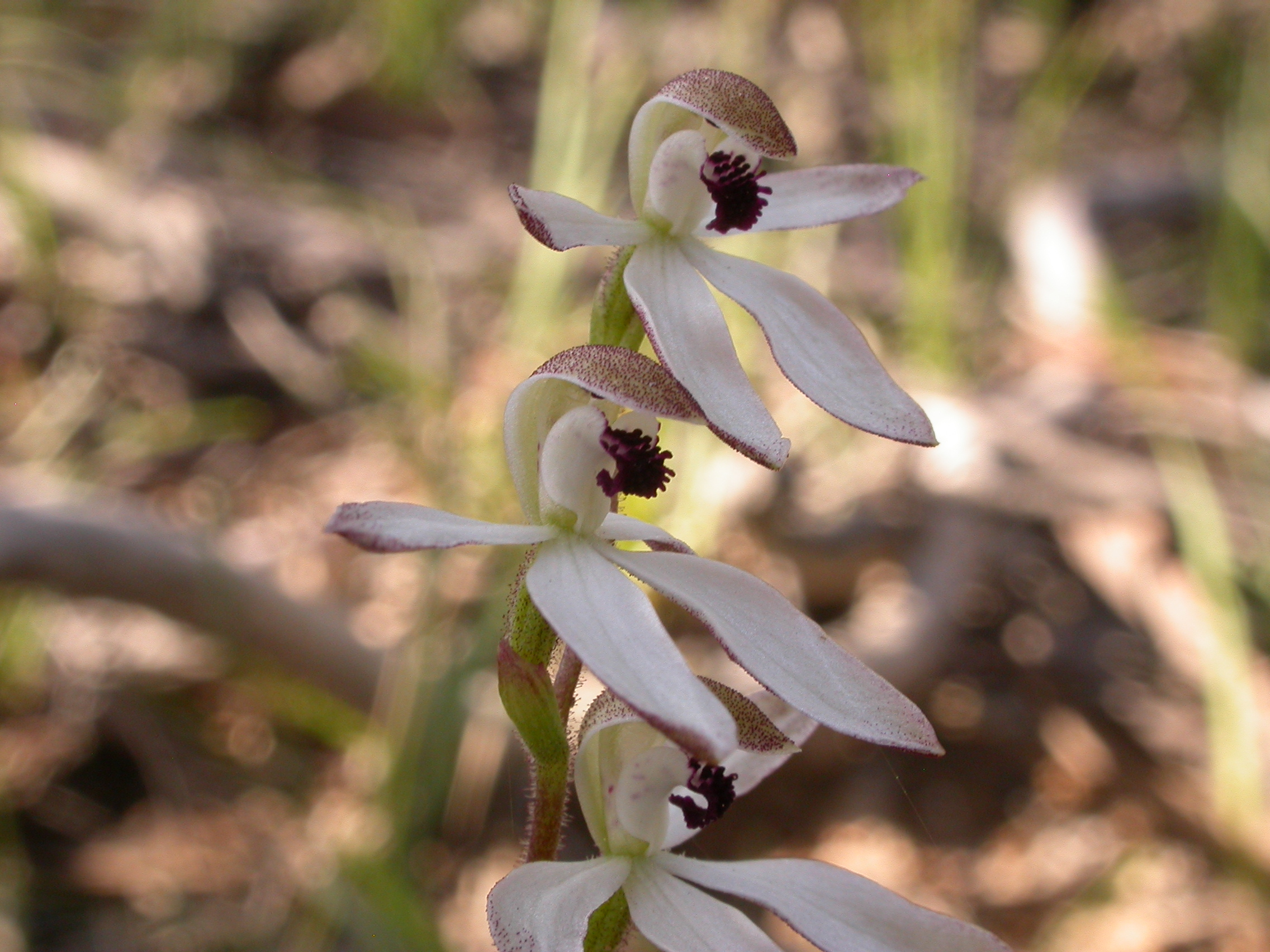
- On Black Mountain in the A.C.T.

Scientific classification
- Kingdom: Plantae
- Clade: Embryophytes
- Clade: Tracheophytes
- Clade: Spermatophytes
- Clade: Angiosperms
- Clade: Monocots
- Order: Asparagales
- Family: Orchidaceae
- Subfamily: Orchidoideae
- Tribe: Diurideae
- Genus: Caladenia
- Species: C. cucullata

Binomial name
- Caladenia cucullata Fitzg.

Synonyms
- Stegostyla cucullata (Fitzg.) D.L.Jones & M.A.Clem.

= Caladenia cucullata =

Hooded caladenia

Species of orchid

Caladenia cucullata, commonly known as the hooded caladenia, is a plant in the orchid family Orchidaceae and is endemic to south-eastern Australia. It is a ground orchid with a single, sparsely hairy leaf, and up to seven white flowers with a purplish labellum.

== Description ==
Caladenia cucullata is a terrestrial, perennial, deciduous, herb with an underground tuber and a single, sparsely hairy, linear leaf, 6–20 cm (2–8 in) long and 1–6 mm (0.04–0.2 in) wide. Up to seven white flowers 10–35 mm (0.4–1 in) in diameter are borne on a spike 10–35 cm (4–10 in) high. The lateral sepals and petals are 8–13 mm (0.3–0.5 in) long, 3–4 mm (0.1–0.2 in) wide, narrow elliptic to egg-shaped and spread horizontally. The outer surface is covered with greenish to brownish glands, the inside white and glabrous, with the petals shorter and narrower than the sepals. The dorsal sepal is broadly egg-shaped, erect near the base but bends at about 90° near the middle, forming a hood over the column. The labellum is more or less egg-shaped, 5–7 mm (0.2–0.3 in) long about 4 mm (0.2 in) wide when flattened and has three lobes. It is white with reddish-purple marks and a dark purple, pointed tip. The sides of the labellum are wavy, more or less erect and the tip is strongly curved downwards. There are four regular rows of thick, club-shaped calli which decrease in size towards the tip of the labellum. The column is bent forwards, has wavy wings and red spots. Flowering occurs from September to November.

== Taxonomy and naming ==
Caladenia cucullata was first formally described by Robert D. FitzGerald in 1876 and the description was published in Australian Orchids. The specific epithet (cucullata) is derived from the Latin word cucullus meaning "cap", or "hood".

== Distribution and habitat ==
Hooded caladenia grows in forests, usually in poor sandy or stony soil. In New South Wales it is found on the tablelands and western slopes south from Dubbo, in Victoria it is widespread, especially in the goldfields and in South Australia it is uncommon, only ever found in the far south-east corner within a short distance from the Victorian border.
