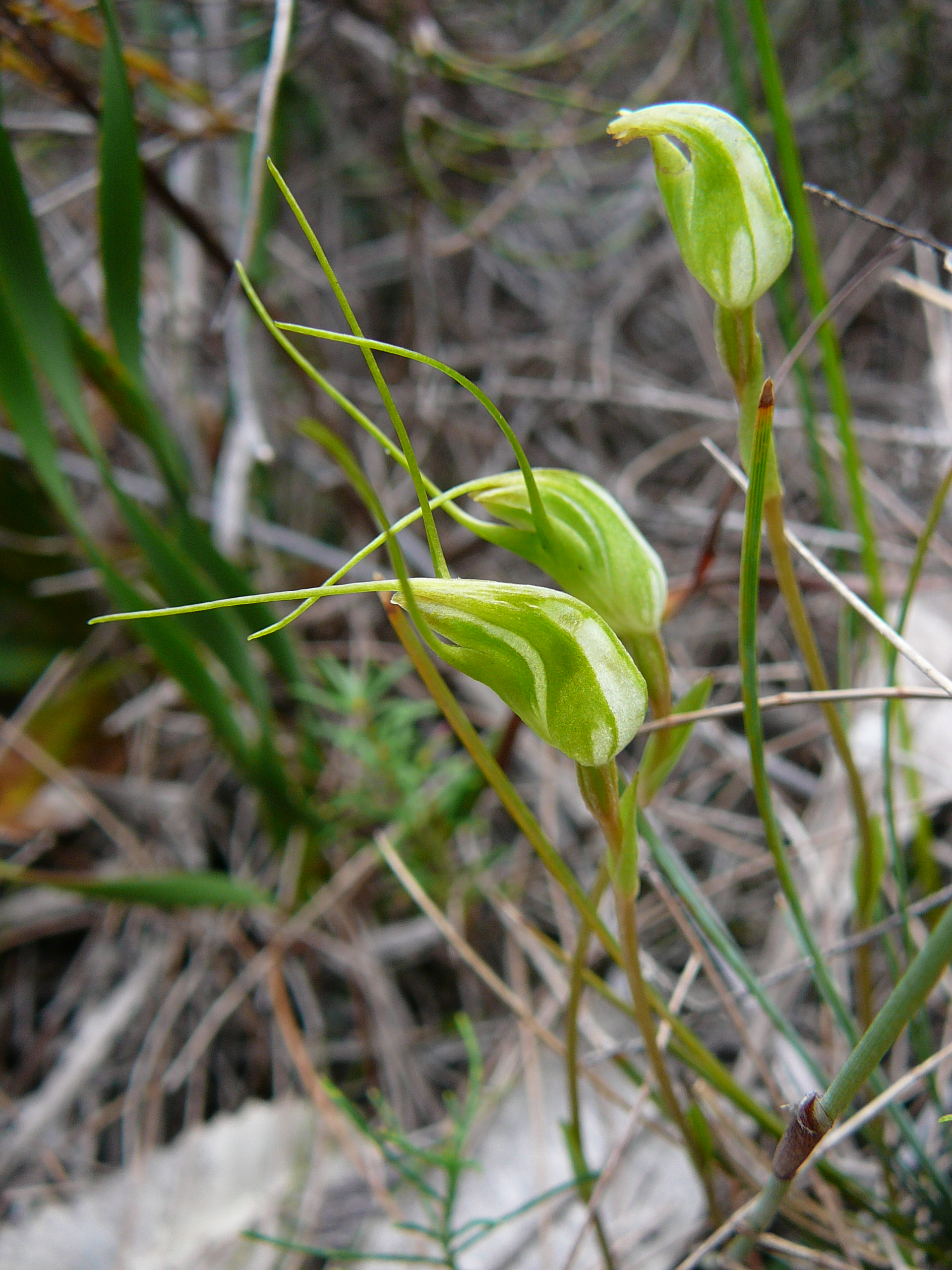
- In Beowa National Park

Scientific classification
- Kingdom: Plantae
- Clade: Tracheophytes
- Clade: Angiosperms
- Clade: Monocots
- Order: Asparagales
- Family: Orchidaceae
- Subfamily: Orchidoideae
- Tribe: Cranichideae
- Genus: Pterostylis
- Species: P. pedoglossa

Binomial name
- Pterostylis pedoglossa Fitzg.

Synonyms
- Crangonorchis pedoglossa (Fitzg.) D.L.Jones & M.A.Clem.; Diplodium pedoglossum (Fitzg.) D.L.Jones & M.A.Clem.; Pterostylis pedaloglossa F.Muell. orth. var.

= Pterostylis pedoglossa =

Prawn greenhood

Species of orchid

Pterostylis pedoglossa, commonly known as the prawn greenhood, is a species of orchid that is endemic to south-eastern Australia. There is a rosette of leaves at the base and flowering plants have a single white flower with green stripes, sometimes with a brownish tinge on the tip, and a long, thread-like labellum.

== Description ==
Pterostylis pedoglossa is a terrestrial, perennial, deciduous, herb with an underground tuber and a rosette of egg-shaped, greyish-green leaves, each leaf 5–25 mm long and 4–20 mm wide. Flowering plants have a single flower 15–20 mm long and 5–6 mm wide borne on a spike 60–150 mm high. The flowers are white with green stripes, sometimes brown near the tip. The dorsal sepal and petals are fused, forming a hood or "galea" over the column, the galea flat or slightly turned downwards on the tip. The dorsal sepal has a thread-like tip 10–25 mm long. The lateral sepals are held closely against the galea, have an erect, thread-like tip 15–30 mm long and a V-shaped sinus between their bases. The labellum is about 4 mm long, 2 mm wide, greenish, thick, straight and not visible from outside the flower. Flowering occurs from March to June.

== Taxonomy and naming ==
Pterostylis pedoglossa was first formally described in 1877 by Robert D. FitzGerald from a specimen collected near Long Bay. The description was published in Fitzgerald's book, Australian Orchids.

== Distribution and habitat ==
The prawn greenhood grows in coastal and near-coastal heath between Sydney and Melbourne. It is also found in Tasmania.
