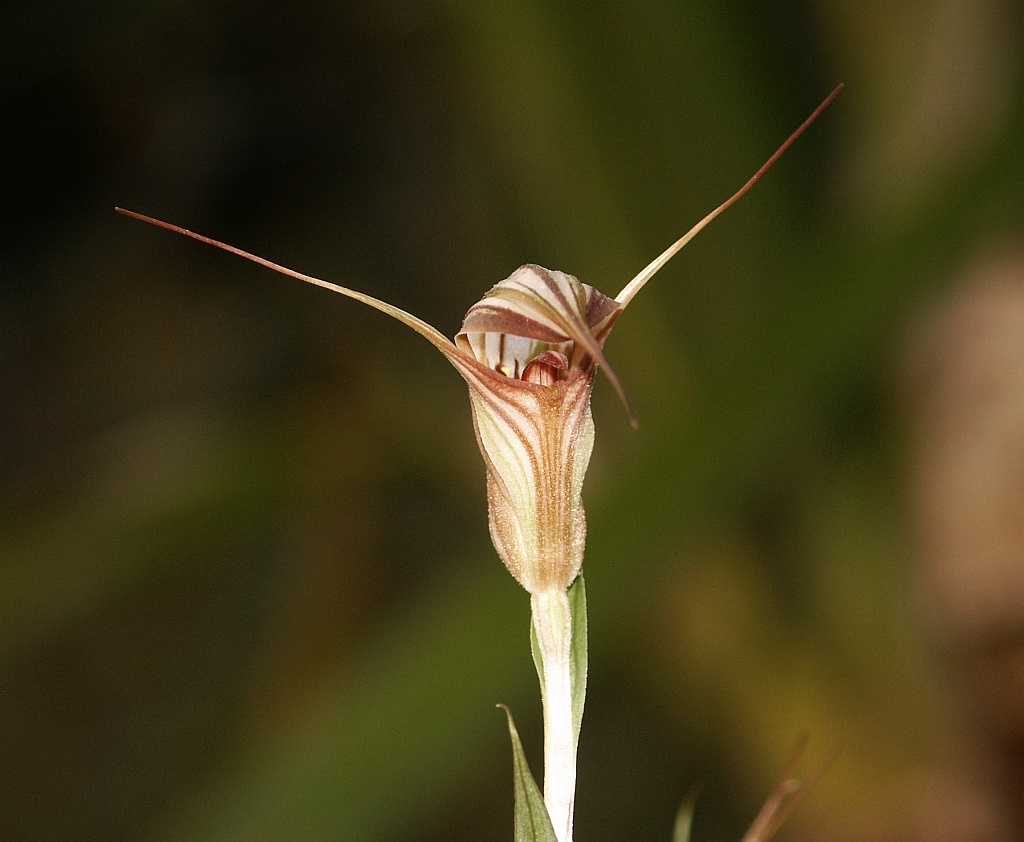

Scientific classification
- Kingdom: Plantae
- Clade: Tracheophytes
- Clade: Angiosperms
- Clade: Monocots
- Order: Asparagales
- Family: Orchidaceae
- Subfamily: Orchidoideae
- Tribe: Cranichideae
- Genus: Pterostylis
- Species: P. coccina

Binomial name
- Pterostylis coccina Fitzg.
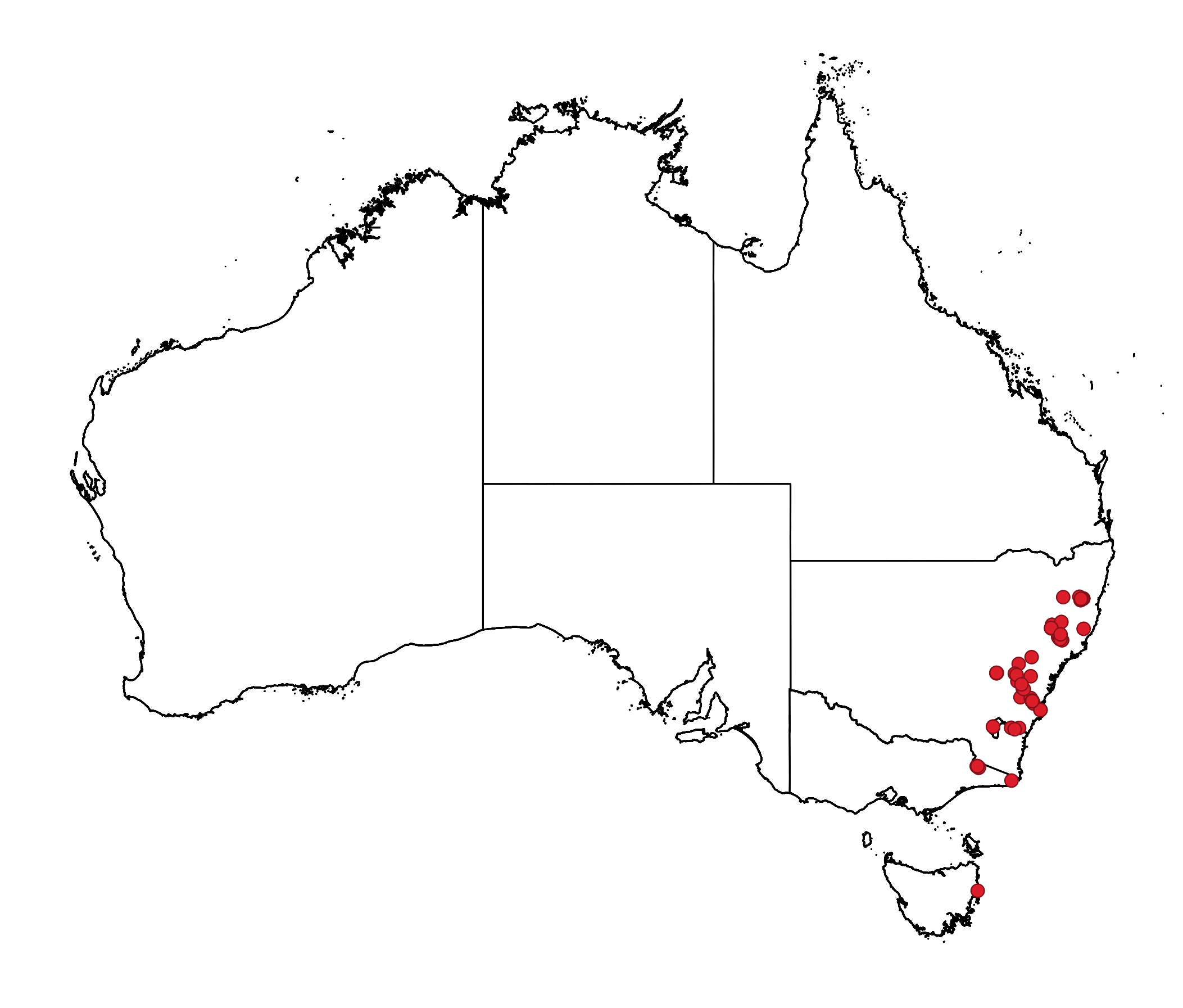
- Occurrence data from AVH

Synonyms
- Diplodium coccinum (Fitzg.) D.L.Jones & M.A.Clem.

= Pterostylis coccina =

Scarlet greenhood

Species of orchid

Pterostylis coccina, commonly known as the scarlet greenhood, is a species of orchid endemic to eastern Australia. As with similar greenhoods, the flowering plants differ from those which are not flowering. The non-flowering plants have a rosette of leaves flat on the ground but the flowering plants have a single flower with leaves on the flowering spike. In this species, the rosette leaves are relatively large and dark green, and the flowers are white, and bluish-green or red. It grows in New South Wales and north-eastern Victoria.

== Description ==
Pterostylis coccina is a terrestrial, perennial, deciduous, herb with an underground tuber and when not flowering, a rosette of two to five egg-shaped, flat, dark green leaves, each leaf 15–30 mm long and 10–15 mm wide. Flowering plants have a single flower 40–50 mm long and 16–19 mm wide borne on a spike 80–220 mm high with between three and five stem leaves. The flowers are white and bluish-green or white and red and lean forwards. The dorsal sepal and petals are fused, forming a hood or "galea" over the column. The dorsal sepal curves forward with a thread-like tip 12–16 mm long. The lateral sepals are held closely against the galea, have erect, thread-like tips 35–45 mm long and a relatively flat, slightly protruding sinus between their bases. The labellum is 20–25 mm long, about 4 mm wide, reddish-brown, blunt, and curved and protrudes beyond the sinus. Flowering occurs from January to April.

== Taxonomy and naming ==
Pterostylis coccina was first formally described in 1878 by Robert FitzGerald and the description was published in Fitzgerald's book, Australian Orchids. The specific epithet (coccina) is a Latin word meaning "red like a berry" or "scarlet".

== Distribution and habitat ==
The scarlet greenhood grows in grassy forest on the higher areas of New South Wales south from Mount Kaputar to north-eastern Victoria.
