= Caladenia oreophila =

Scientific classification
- Kingdom: Plantae
- Clade: Tracheophytes
- Clade: Angiosperms
- Clade: Monocots
- Order: Asparagales
- Family: Orchidaceae
- Subfamily: Orchidoideae
- Tribe: Diurideae
- Genus: Caladenia
- Species: C. oreophila

Binomial name
- Caladenia oreophila ( D.L.Jones) G.N.Backh.

Synonyms
- Arachnorchis oreophila D.L.Jones

Species of orchid

Caladenia oreophila is a plant in the orchid family Orchidaceae and is endemic to south-eastern Australia. It is a ground orchid with a single leaf and a single greenish-cream flower with pale red stripes a red labellum with a greenish-cream base.

== Description ==
Caladenia oreophila is a terrestrial, perennial, deciduous, herb with a spherical underground tuber and a single leaf, 60–100 mm (2–4 in) long and 5–12 mm (0.2–0.5 in) wide. A single greenish-cream flower with pale red stripes is borne on a spike 120–200 mm (5–8 in) tall. The sepals have dark red, club-like glandular tips 2–5 mm (0.08–0.2 in) long and are 20–30 mm (0.8–1 in) long and 2–3 mm (0.08–0.1 in) wide whilst the petals are slightly shorter. The sepals and petals curve downwards, the petals more widely spreading than the sepals. The petals taper to a point and lack club-like tips. The labellum is reddish with a greenish-cream base, 11–13 mm (0.4–0.5 in) long and 7–8 mm (0.28–0.31 in) wide with the sides curved upwards and the tip curled under. The sides of the labellum have triangular teeth about 0.5 mm (0.02 in) long, decreasing in size towards the tip. There are four rows of calli about 1 mm (0.04 in) long near the base of the labellum and tapering towards the tip. Flowering occurs in September and October.

== Taxonomy and naming ==
This orchid was first formally described in 2006 by David Jones and given the name Arachnorchis oreophila. The description was published in Australian Orchid Research. In 2007 Gary Backhouse changed the name to Caladenia oreophila. The specific epithet (oreophila) is said to be derived from the Greek oreos, mountain, philos, loving, in reference to its habitat. The proper word for "mountain" in ancient Greek is however oros (ὄρος).

== Distribution and habitat ==
Caladenia oreophila is only known from the Cann River valley in Victoria, growing in tall forest with a sparse understorey. It probably also occurs on the Southern Tablelands of New South Wales.

== Conservation ==
Caladenia oreophila is listed as "endangered" under the Victorian Flora and Fauna Guarantee Act 1988.
