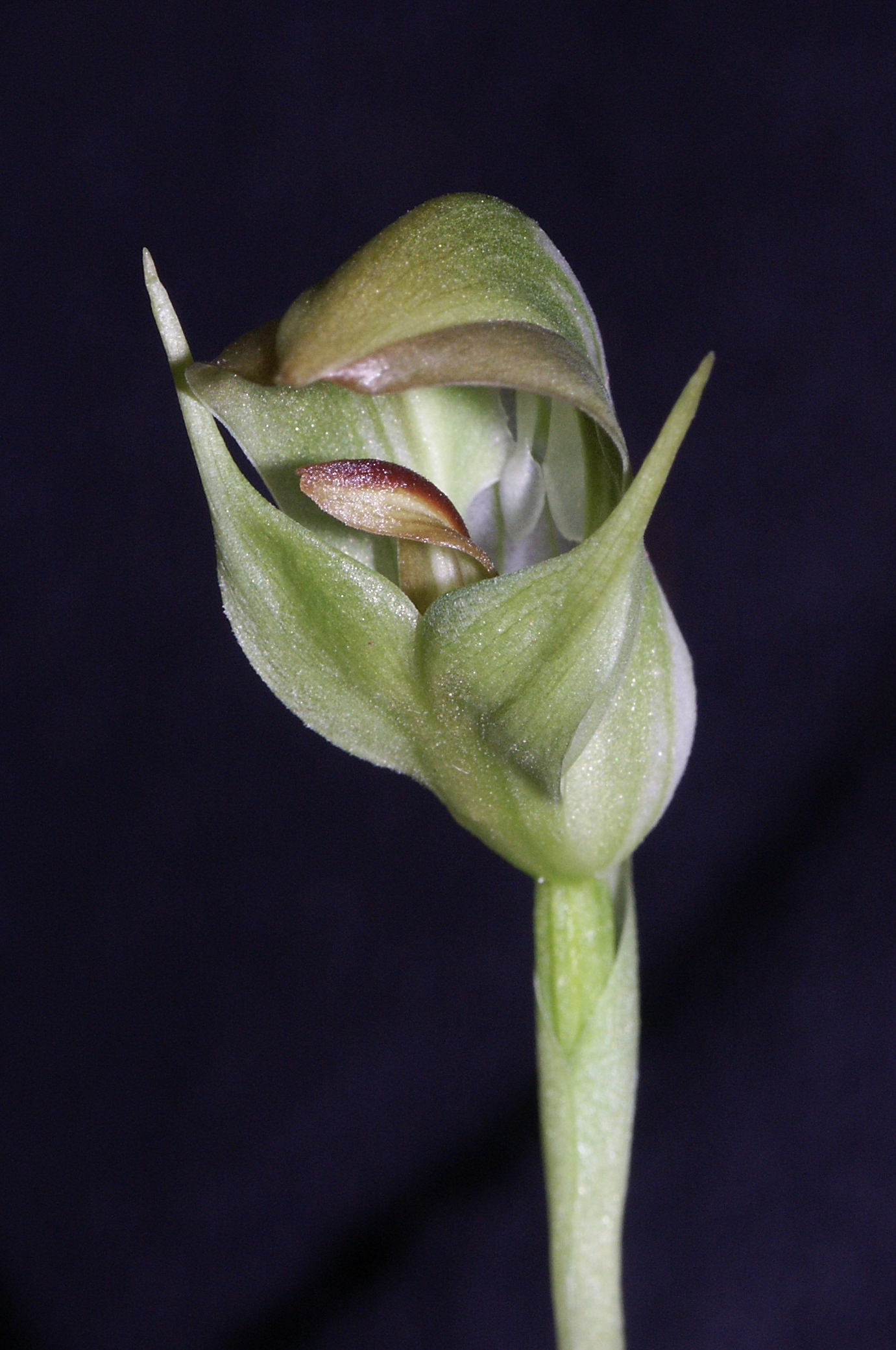

Scientific classification
- Kingdom: Plantae
- Clade: Tracheophytes
- Clade: Angiosperms
- Clade: Monocots
- Order: Asparagales
- Family: Orchidaceae
- Subfamily: Orchidoideae
- Tribe: Cranichideae
- Genus: Pterostylis
- Species: P. curta

Binomial name
- Pterostylis curta R.Br.

= Pterostylis curta =

Blunt greenhood

Species of orchid

Pterostylis curta, commonly known as the blunt greenhood, is a species of orchid found in south-eastern Australia, Lord Howe Island and New Caledonia. It has a rosette of leaves at its base and a single white and green, forward leaning flower with a brown tip and a twisted labellum.

== Description ==
Pterostylis curta has a rosette of between two and six egg-shaped to elliptic leaves, each leaf 20–100 mm (0.8–4 in) long and 10–30 mm (0.4–1 in) wide. The leaves are dark green, have a distinct petiole and sometimes a wavy edge. A single white and green flower with a brown tip is borne on a flowering spike 100–300 mm (4–10 in) high, the flower leaning forwards. The flowers are 28–35 mm (1.1–1.4 in) long, 11–15 mm (0.4–0.6 in) wide. The dorsal sepal and petals are fused to form a hood or "galea" over the column. The dorsal sepal and petals are a similar length and end in a blunt tip. There is a wide gap at each side of the flower between the petals and lateral sepals. The lateral sepals are erect, about the same length as the galea, 10–18 mm (0.4–0.7 in) long and there is a broad V-shaped sinus between them. The labellum is 17–22 mm (0.7–0.9 in) long, 4–5 mm (0.16–0.20 in) wide, brown, twisted to one side and just visible above the sinus. Flowering occurs from July to October.

== Taxonomy and naming ==
Pterostylis curta was first described in 1810 by Robert Brown and the description was published in Prodromus Florae Novae Hollandiae et Insulae Van Diemen. The specific epithet (curta) means "short".

== Distribution and habitat ==
The blunt greenhood is widespread and common in Queensland, New South Wales, Victoria and Tasmania, growing in moist places in heath, scrub, woodland and forest. It also occurs on Lord Howe Island and in New Caledonia but is rare in South Australia.

== Use in horticulture ==
Pterostylis curta has received the Royal Horticultural Society's Award of Garden Merit. It is easily grown in pots containing a free-draining, sandy mix. The plants require regular watering during their growing period, to be kept dry during dormancy and to be repotted annually.
