= Robert D. FitzGerald =

Irish-Australian surveyor, ornithologist, botanist and poet

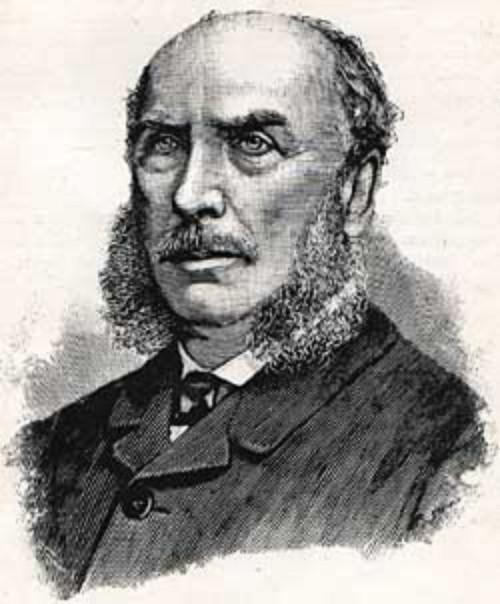
- Born: 30 November 1830; Tralee, County Kerry
- Died: 12 August 1892 (aged 61); Hunters Hill, Sydney, New South Wales
- Occupations: surveyor, ornithologist, botanist and poet
- Spouse: Emily Blackwell
- Children: three sons and three daughters
- Parent(s): Robert David FitzGerald & Mary Ann, née Bell

Robert David FitzGerald (or possibly Robert Desmond FitzGerald) (30 November 1830 – 12 August 1892) was an Irish-Australian surveyor, ornithologist, botanist and poet.

Whilst working as a public servant FitzGerald's private passion and ability regarding ornithology and botany became so skillful that he communicated directly with Charles Darwin regarding Australian species of plant and was referred to several times in the book The Different Forms of Flowers on Plants of the Same Species of 1877. He also collected orchids for the German-Australian botanist Ferdinand von Mueller.

His extraordinary skills gave rise to a volume of work completed over seven years called Australian Orchids which Joseph Dalton Hooker another botanist, considered "would be an honour to any country and to any Botanist".

== Biography ==
=== Early life ===
FitzGerald was born in Tralee, County Kerry, Ireland. His father, also Robert David FitzGerald, was a banker, and his mother was Mary Ann, née Bell. He studied civil engineering at Queen's College, Cork, (now known as University College Cork), and emigrated to Australia.

=== Working as a surveyor ===
FitzGerald arrived in Sydney, Australia in 1856 and a short time later was appointed to the Department of Lands as a draftsman for the crown.

Working steadily until 1868 FitzGerald was then promoted to control the roads branch of that department.

By 1873 he had become Deputy Surveyor General, and by 1874 he had been given responsibility as the Chief Mining Surveyor as well as controller of Church and School Lands for New South Wales. Following the advent of the Crown Lands Act of 1884 part of his duty was to analyse and consider the future roles of his department and ironically that analysis resulted in a number of retrenchments including his own.

=== Ornithology and botany ===
In his private life FitzGerald developed his skills as an ornithologist. Coupled with his skills as a taxidermist he initially (during 1855–56) contributed a number of articles on the birds of his hometown Kerry to that town's magazine.

More specifically FitzGerald had an enormous interest in botany and in 1864 he travelled to Wallis Lake, north of Newcastle in New South Wales to collect ferns and orchids which he intended to cultivate around his Hunters Hill home.

This interest in orchids was maintained throughout his life and in 1869, 1871 and 1876 he visited Lord Howe Island to collect further botanical samples. It was during this time that he discovered Dracophyllum fitzgeraldii F. Muell, which was later to be named in his honour.

=== Marriage and children ===
FitzGerald married Emily Blackwell, daughter of Edward Hunt, M.L.C., at Balmain in 1860. FitzGerald had three sons and three daughters who survived his death. His youngest son was Gerald Fitzgerald (artist) and his grandson was the poet R. D. Fitzgerald.

=== Death ===
FitzGerald died on 12 August 1892 at Hunters Hill and he was buried in the Presbyterian section of the old Balmain Cemetery.

== Published works ==
=== Australian Orchids ===
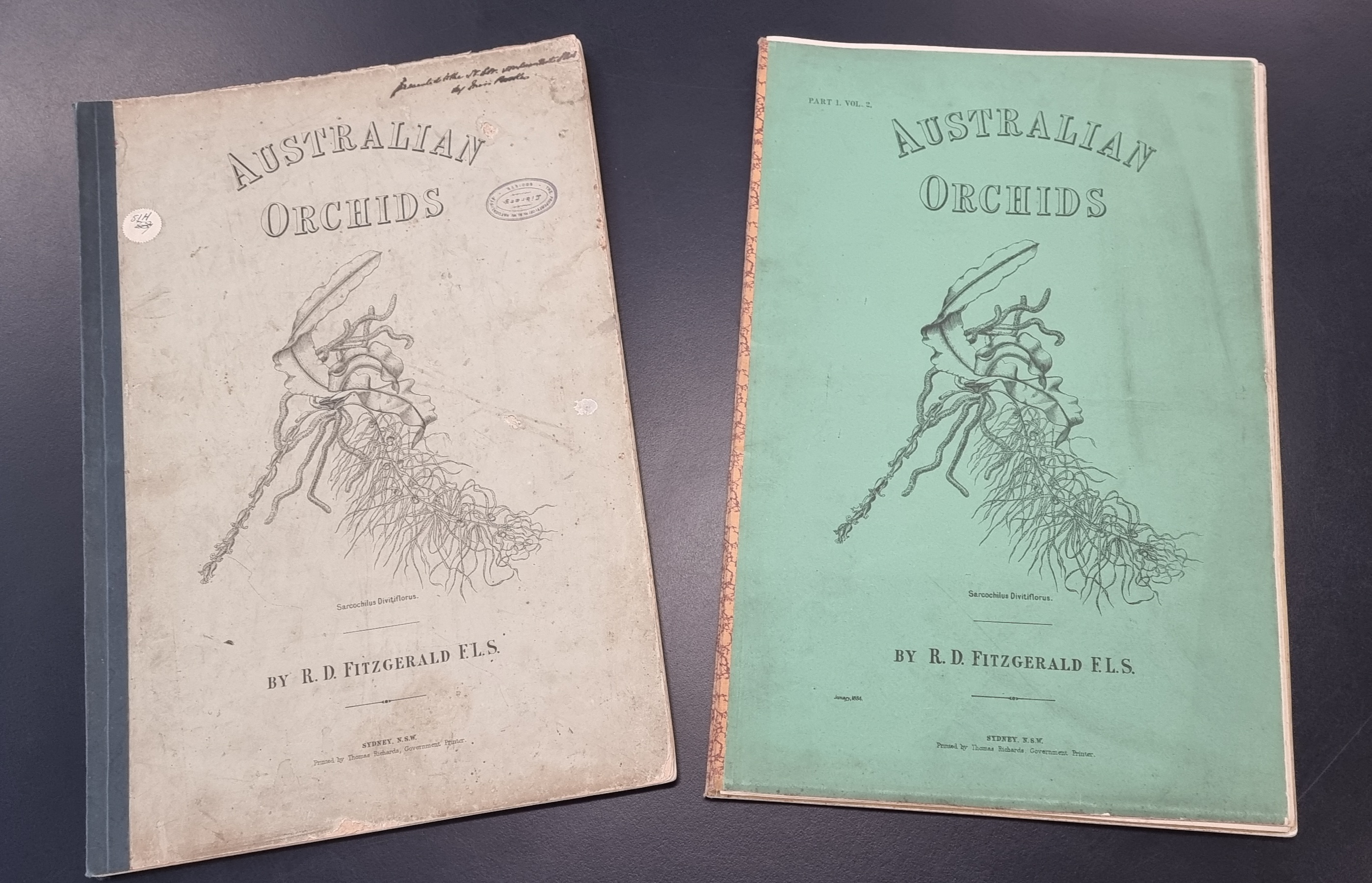
Australian Orchids, Part one, volumes 2 & 3, Robert David FitzGerald, 1882

From 1875 until 1882 in association with Arthur James Stopps who was a lithographer in the same public offices that he worked at, FitzGerald published seven parts of his work Australian Orchids. The exquisite lithograph plates detailing FitzGerald's dissections of orchids, were hand-coloured by artists following his samples and instructions. Australian Orchids made FitzGerald famous in the botanical world and Joseph Dalton Hooker another botanist, considered the work one "which would be an honour to any country and to any Botanist".

Australian Orchids included descriptions of more than two hundred species. Fitzgerald was encouraged by the government of the day, who covered his costs and published his work, but the author died before the task was completed and nearly one hundred of his unpublished drawings are held in the State Library of New South Wales. After completing his drawings, Fitzgerald did not dry and preserve the specimens but threw them away, so few species he described and named have preserved type specimens. No attempt was made to follow any system of classification and the plates and pages were not numbered, making it difficult for readers to find a particular drawing.

=== Manuscript notes ===
Manuscript notes on botanical species including watercolour sketches and diagrams with botanical annotations which were completed by hand by Fitzgerald between 1870 and 1890, and are held by National Library of Australia.

=== Published drawings ===
The originals of FitzGerald's drawings completed in Sydney published between 1874 and 1894, of Australian orchids including 196 water-colour and pencil drawings with the artists pencilled notes in 2 volumes is held as a part of the Mitchell and Dixson Libraries Manuscripts Collection, State Library of New South Wales.

=== Published letters ===
A number of letters dated between 1871 and 1892 from FitzGerald to the German/Australian botanist Ferdinand von Mueller about Australian plants and their identification with references to Herbarium specimens as well as a single letter from G.H. Druce to FitzGerald are held at the National Herbarium of Victoria, Melbourne.

== Honours and awards ==
=== Eponyms ===
1. The spider orchid, Caladenia fitzgeraldii is named in his honour.
2. The ravine orchid, Sarcochilus fitzgeraldii is named in his honour.
3. Dracophyllum fitzgeraldii, which he discovered on Lord Howe Island is named in his honour.
4. Eugenia fitzgeraldii, now a synonym of Syzygium hodgkinsoniae was named in his honour.

=== Medals ===
1. Received bronze medal from Agricultural Society of NSW in 1871 for his work on orchids.
2. Received gold medal from the Exhibition Internationale de Paris in 1878 Australian Orchids.
3. Received bronze medal from the Sydney International Exhibition in 1879.
4. Received silver medal from the Melbourne International Exhibition in 1880.
5. Received the Amsterdam Medal D'Or in 1883.
6. Received bronze medal from the Colonial and Indian Exhibition in London in 1886.

=== Memberships ===
1. Made an honorary member of Field Naturalists' Club of Victoria.
2. Elected a fellow of the Linnean Society of London in 1874.
3. Elected a member of the Royal Society of New South Wales in 1876.

=== Other honours ===
1. Fitzgerald County, New South Wales is named in his honour.
