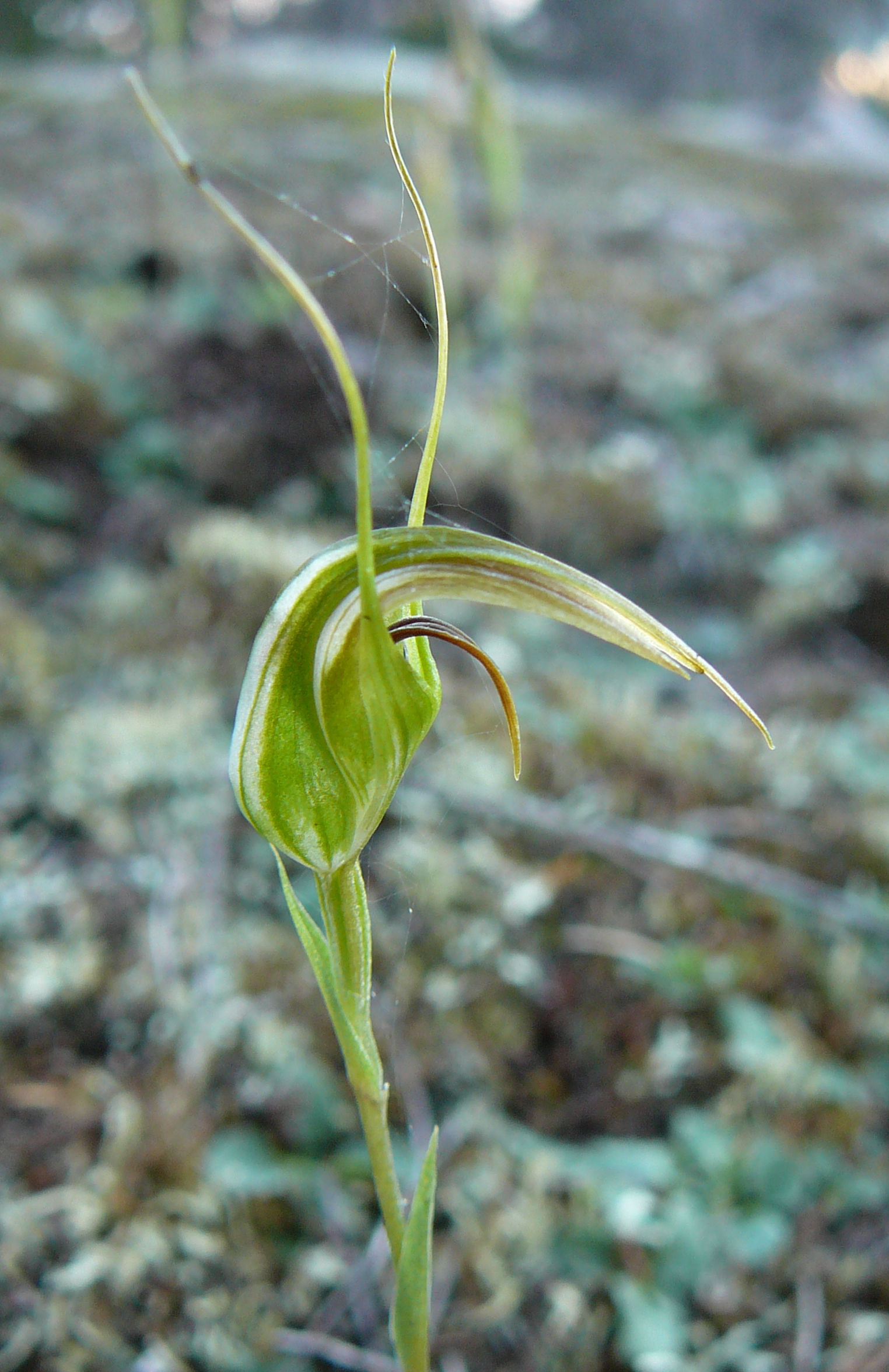
- Pterostylis longipetala growing in Bournda National Park

Scientific classification
- Kingdom: Plantae
- Clade: Tracheophytes
- Clade: Angiosperms
- Clade: Monocots
- Order: Asparagales
- Family: Orchidaceae
- Subfamily: Orchidoideae
- Tribe: Cranichideae
- Genus: Pterostylis
- Species: P. longipetala

Binomial name
- Pterostylis longipetala Rupp

Synonyms
- Diplodium longipetalum (Rupp) D.L.Jones & M.A.Clem.

= Pterostylis longipetala =

Curved greenhood

Species of orchid

Pterostylis longipetala, commonly known as curved greenhood, is a species of orchid endemic to eastern Australia. As with similar greenhoods, the flowering plants differ from those which are not flowering. The non-flowering plants have a rosette of leaves flat on the ground but the flowering plants have a single flower with leaves on the flowering spike. This greenhood has dark green, brown and white flowers which lean slightly forwards and have sharply-pointed petals and a long, curved labellum.

== Description ==
Pterostylis longipetala is a terrestrial, perennial, deciduous, herb with an underground tuber and when not flowering, a rosette of between three and six egg-shaped, dark green leaves lying flat on the ground. Each leaf is 8–15 mm (0.3–0.6 in) long and 4–10 mm (0.2–0.4 in) wide. Flowering plants have a single flower 14–17 mm (0.6–0.7 in) long and 4–8 mm (0.2–0.3 in) wide which leans slightly forwards, on a flowering stem 100–160 mm (4–6 in) high with between three and five stem leaves. The flowers are dark green, brown and white. The dorsal sepal and petals are fused, forming a hood or "galea" over the column. The dorsal sepal has a thread-like tip 6–12 mm (0.2–0.5 in) long and the petals have pointed tips. The lateral sepals are erect, held closely against the galea, have thread-like tips 20–25 mm (0.8–1 in) long and a V-shaped sinus between their bases. The labellum is 12–15 mm (0.5–0.6 in) long, about 3 mm (0.1 in) wide, dark reddish-brown and curved, and protrudes above the sinus. Flowering occurs from April to June.

== Taxonomy and naming ==
Pterostylis longipetala was first formally described in 1943 by Herman Rupp from a specimen collected at Batemans Bay. The description was published in Proceedings of the Linnean Society of New South Wales. The specific epithet (longipetala) is derived from the Latin words longus meaning "long" and petalum meaning "petal". Rupp did not give a reason for this epithet but did note that "the petals are narrower and longer than in any other species of Pterostylis known to me".

== Distribution and habitat ==
Curved greenhood grows on moist slopes in coastal and near coastal forests in New South Wales.
