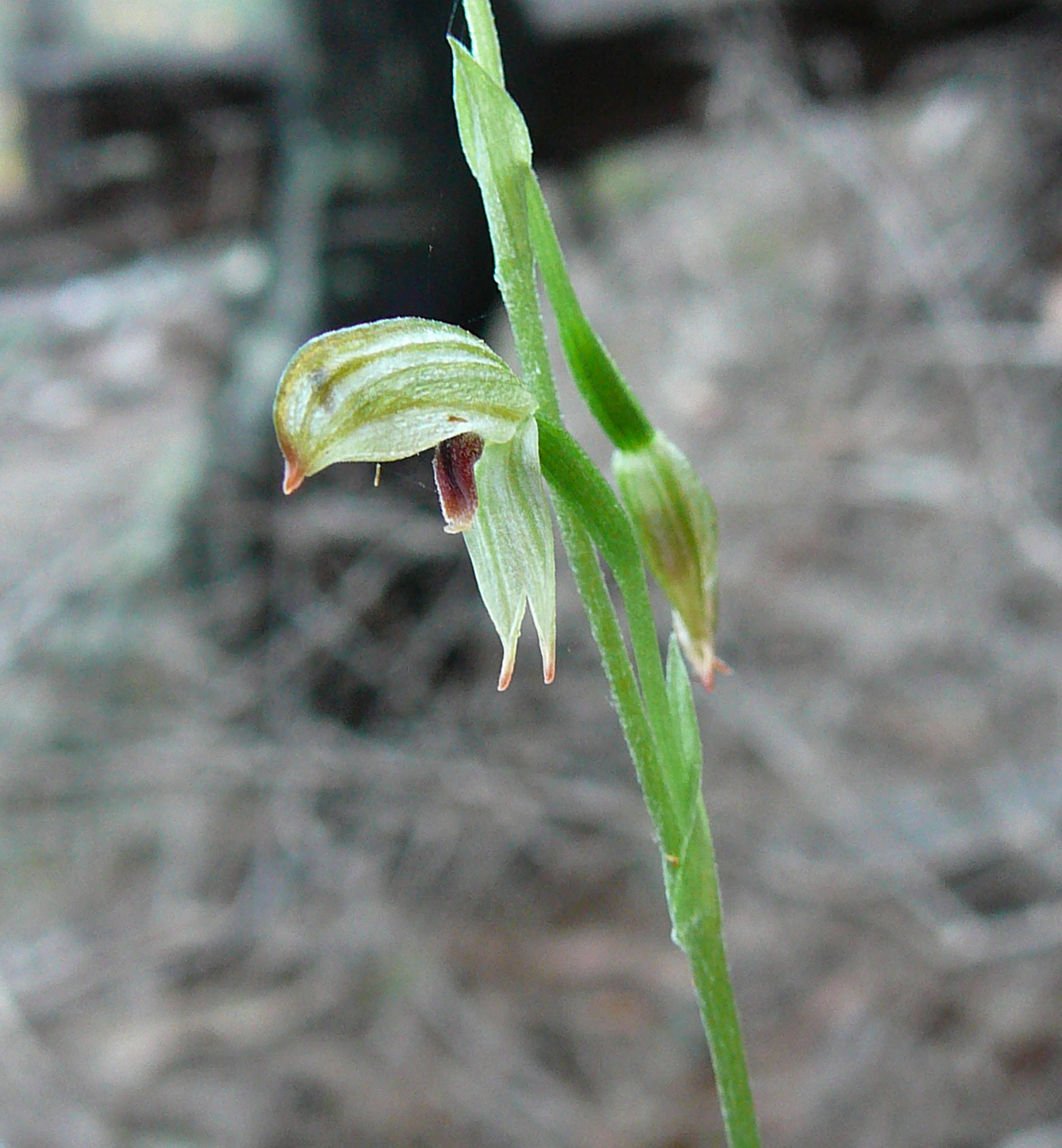
- In Bournda National Park

Scientific classification
- Kingdom: Plantae
- Clade: Embryophytes
- Clade: Tracheophytes
- Clade: Spermatophytes
- Clade: Angiosperms
- Clade: Monocots
- Order: Asparagales
- Family: Orchidaceae
- Subfamily: Orchidoideae
- Tribe: Cranichideae
- Genus: Pterostylis
- Species: P. tunstallii

Binomial name
- Pterostylis tunstallii D.L.Jones & M.A.Clem.

Synonyms
- Oligochaetochilus tunstallii (D.L.Jones & M.A.Clem.) Szlach.; Bunochilus tunstallii (D.L.Jones & M.A.Clem.) D.L.Jones & M.A.Clem.

= Pterostylis tunstallii =

Tunstall's greenhood

Species of orchid

Pterostylis tunstallii, commonly known as Tunstall's greenhood or granite greenhood is a plant in the orchid family Orchidaceae and is endemic to south-eastern Australia. Flowering plants have up to ten transparent green flowers which have a dark brown, insect-like labellum with a blackish "head". Non-flowering plants have a rosette of leaves on a short stalk but flowering plants lack the rosette, instead having five to eight stem leaves.

== Description ==
Pterostylis tunstallii, is a terrestrial, perennial, deciduous, herb with an underground tuber. Non-flowering plants have a rosette of between three and five egg-shaped leaves on a stalk 30–60 mm (1–2 in) long, each leaf 10–40 mm (0.4–2 in) long and 4–9 mm (0.2–0.4 in) wide. Flowering plants have up to ten transparent green flowers on a flowering spike 150–500 mm (6–20 in) high. The flowering spike has between five and eight stem leaves which are 30–60 mm (1–2 in) long and 3–5 mm (0.1–0.2 in) wide. The flowers are 7–10 mm (0.3–0.4 in) long, 5–7 mm (0.2–0.3 in) wide. The dorsal sepal and petals are fused, forming a hood or "galea" over the column with the dorsal sepal having a short point on its tip. The lateral sepals turn downwards, are 7–10 mm (0.3–0.4 in) long, 5–7 mm (0.2–0.3 in) wide, joined for most of their length and have a narrow tip about 4 mm (0.2 in) long which is brown on its end. The labellum is insect-like, about 5 mm (0.2 in) long, 2 mm (0.08 in) wide and dark brown with a blackish "head" end. Flowering occurs from July to August.

== Taxonomy and naming ==
Pterostylis tunstallii was first formally described in 1989 by David Jones and Mark Clements and the description was published in Australian Orchid Research. The specific epithet (tunstallii) honours Ronald George Tunstall who collected the type specimen.

== Distribution and habitat ==
Tunstall's greenhood occurs south from Blue Mountains in New South Wales, in southern Victoria east from Wilsons Promontory and in Tasmania including the Bass Strait islands. It grows in moist forest in coastal and near-coastal districts.
