= Port of Eden =

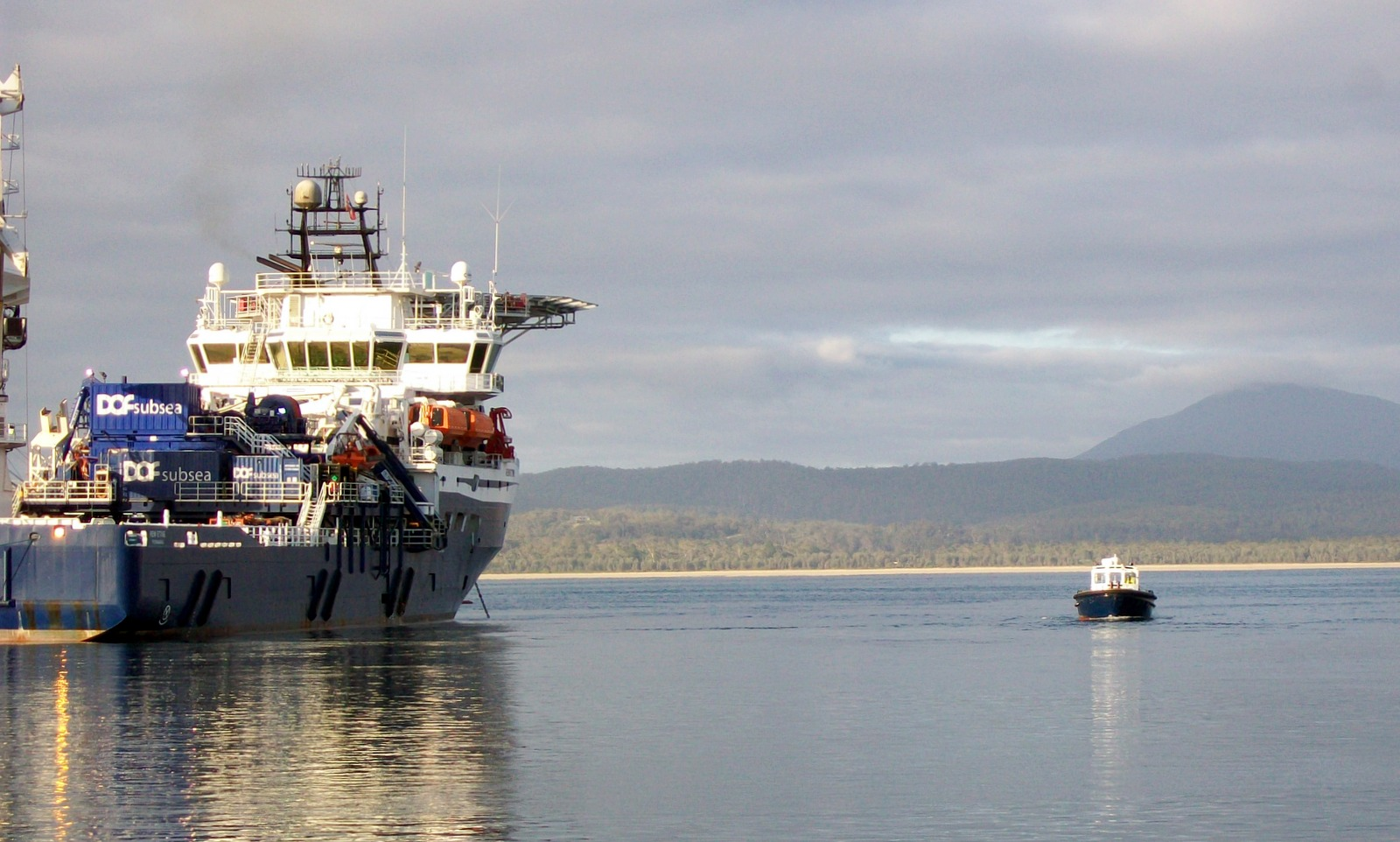
- REM Etive at Eden and Mount Imlay

- Location in Australia

Location
- Country: Australia
- Location: Eden, South Coast, New South Wales
- Coordinates: 37°04′S 149°54′E
- UN/LOCODE: AUQDN

Details
- Operated by: Port Authority of NSW
- Owned by: Port Authority of NSW
- Type of harbour: Seaport
- Land area: 10 hectares (25 acres)
- No. of berths: 3
- Draft depth: 8.2 m.

Statistics
- Vessel arrivals: circa 70 (FY2012)
- Annual cargo tonnage: 1,007,643 tonnes (991,729 long tons) (FY2011)
- Website; Port Authority of NSW

The Port of Eden is a small seaport situated in Twofold Bay, adjacent to the town of Eden, located in the South Coast region of New South Wales, Australia.

The Port is home to one of the largest fishing fleets in New South Wales; and woodchip export is currently the major trade for the port, exporting 1,007,643 tonnes (991,729 long tons) for the year to 30 June 2011. Major vessel movements occur between Japan, China and Korea.

Principal imports are break bulk and machinery and equipment, mainly for the oil and gas industry. Principal exports are hardwood and softwood woodchips, softwood logs, explosives, and machinery and equipment for the oil and gas industry.

Since 1 July 2014, the port has been managed by Port Authority of NSW, a corporation owned by the NSW Government.

Today tourism is one of the major industries for the town, with a new Cruise Terminal opening 2019.

== Industries ==
The port is a principal export point for timber products. During the year ended 30 June 2011, South East Fibre Exports Pty Limited exported 1,007,643 tonnes (991,729 long tons) in woodchips to customers located in Japan and Korea. Woodchip storage and packaging facilities were constructed by Harris Daishowa in 1971.

A substantial fishing fleet also operates from the port and from Snug Cove.

Minor port uses include import and export services for the towns of Eden, Bega, Bombala and Cooma, and as a stopover for national and international cruise ships.

In 1960 Mobil constructed a dedicated wharf, tanks and plant for small-scale petroleum imports and distribution to southern New South Wales.

Approximately 70 commercial vessels visited the Port of Eden during the year ended 30 June 2012; including two passenger cruise ships. Civilian shipping movements in the port are regulated by a harbour master appointed by NSW Maritime.

The port is also shared with the Department of Defence and serviced approximately 30 Royal Australian Navy ships for the year ended 30 June 2012. The Navy facility consists of a wharf, an access jetty and road, and a land-based munitions store 15 kilometres (9.3 mi) from the bay and surrounded by a 100 hectares (250 acres) exclusion zone.

== Facilities ==
The port consists of two commercial shipping wharves, the Mobil petroleum wharf, a cargo storage area and ancillary facilities.

The Breakwater Wharf caters for the timber industry, the fishing fleet and cruise shipping. The wharf is 105 metres (344 ft) long with depths ranging from 3 metres (9.8 ft) to the landward end and 8.8 metres (29 ft) seaward, with a tidal variation of 2 metres (6 ft 7 in). The wharf itself is concrete with rubber fending.

In 2003 a multi-purpose wharf and munitions facility was constructed to expand naval repair and refit operations and increase the port's timber export capacity by 150,000 tonnes (150,000 long tons). The length of the multi-purpose wharf is 200 metres (660 ft), accessed via a 560 metres (1,840 ft) timber jetty. Berthing depth is 12 metres (39 ft) but maximum vessel raft is restricted by a low-water fairway depth of 11 metres (36 ft).

The common-user cargo storage area covers 10 hectares (25 acres) with a gravel surface and sealed internal roads. Storage capacity was estimated to reach 500,000 tonnes (490,000 long tons) in 2010/11.

== Cruise terminal ==
Since 2014, the Port of Eden has seen a significant increase in cruise ship visitation. To allow cruise ships to berth alongside in Snug Cove, rather than anchoring in Twofold Bay and tendering passengers ashore by boat, a $44 million wharf extension commenced construction in August 2017 and was completed in August 2019.

Passenger vessels up to 345 metres in length are able to berth alongside the upgraded wharf due to the completion of the following key works:

dredging of approximately 231,500m3 of in situ material from the bed of Snug Cove/Twofold Bay and installing scour protection a new wharf face approximately 110m long, resulting from extending the existing wharf. installing three mooring dolphins and two berthing dolphins installing onshore mooring bollards on the existing wharf upgrading existing services such as lighting, power and potable water and emergency fire-fighting water installing navigation aids.

The first cruise ship to use the updated wharf was the Pacific Explorer that visited on 14 September 2019.

Since the upgrades to the wharf, the Port continues to host on average thirty Cruise Ships annually.

The site planning approval permits vessels up to 370m in length to visit at the berth. The following additional infrastructure would need to be developed prior to receiving these longer vessels: installation of an additional mooring dolphin, passenger catwalk extension.

As a consequence of the extended wharf, Eden will experience an increasing visitation of cruise ships and opportunities to local businesses will grow to drive a predicted $48.4 million in regional economic growth, as well as creating more than 80 jobs in the tourism, hospitality and stevedoring industry.

To cater for the growth of cruising to Eden, Port Authority officially opened the Eden Welcome Centre to welcome cruise passengers visiting Snug Cove in April 2022. The Welcome Centre is home to the Eden Visitor Information Centre, which occupies the entire ground floor.

== History ==
=== European history ===
The bay was first charted by explorer George Bass in 1797 and has been used for commercial whaling and fishing since the 1840s. From the 1850s to 1950s the port was serviced by steamship companies, including the Illawarra Steam Navigation Company.

== Gallery ==
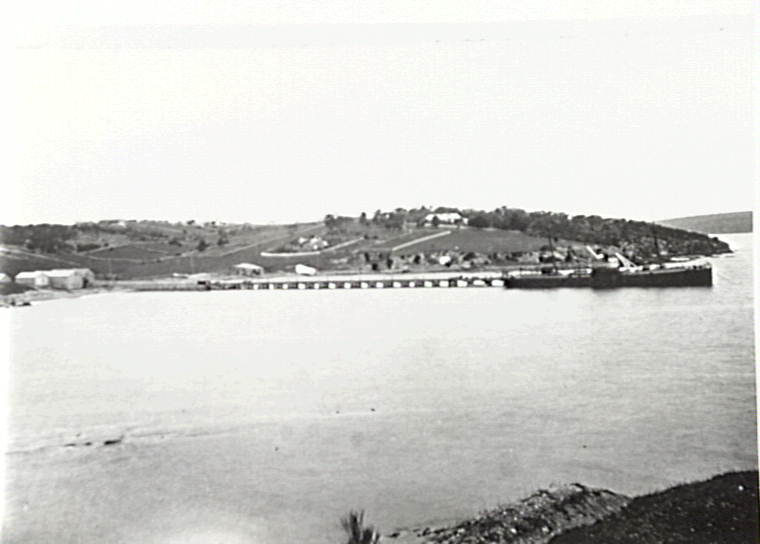
Illawarra Steam Navigation Company's S.S. Bega at Eden in 1903.

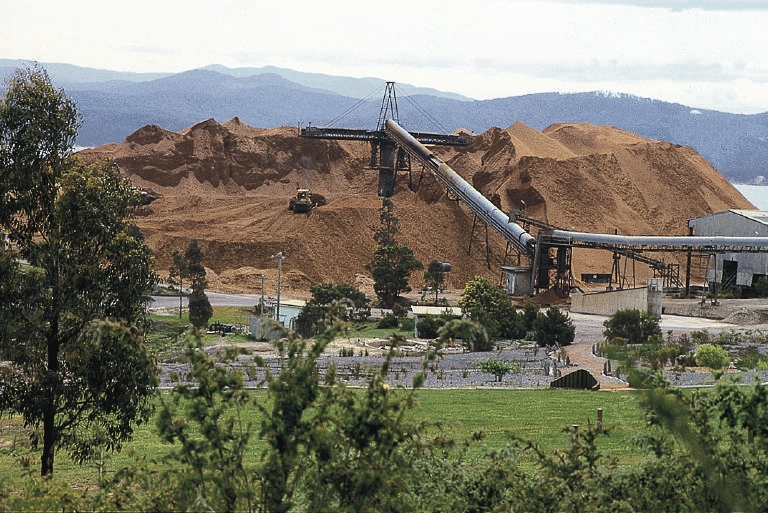
Woodchips await export to Japan from the Harris-Daishowa mill near Eden.

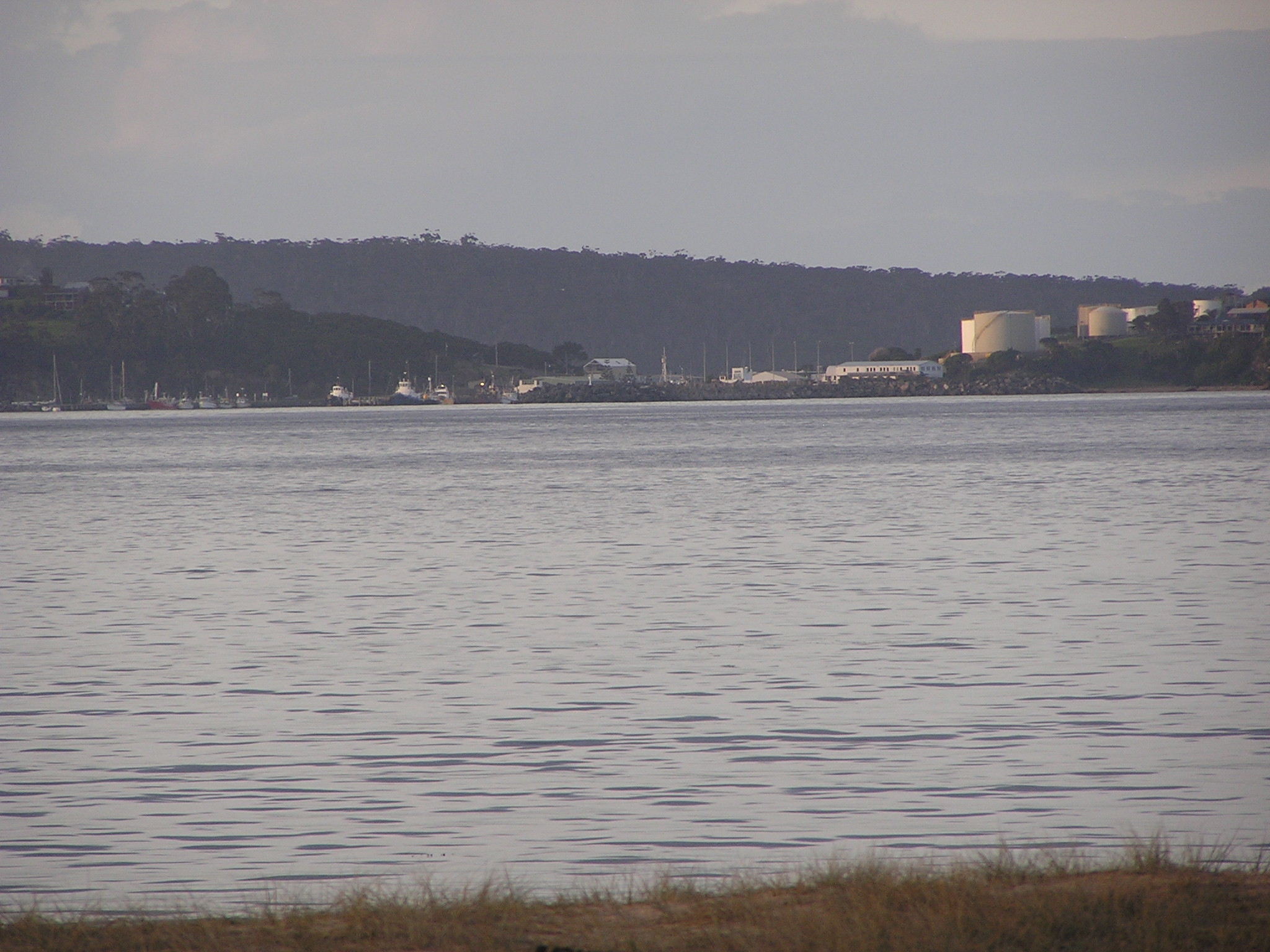
View of port from Boydtown.

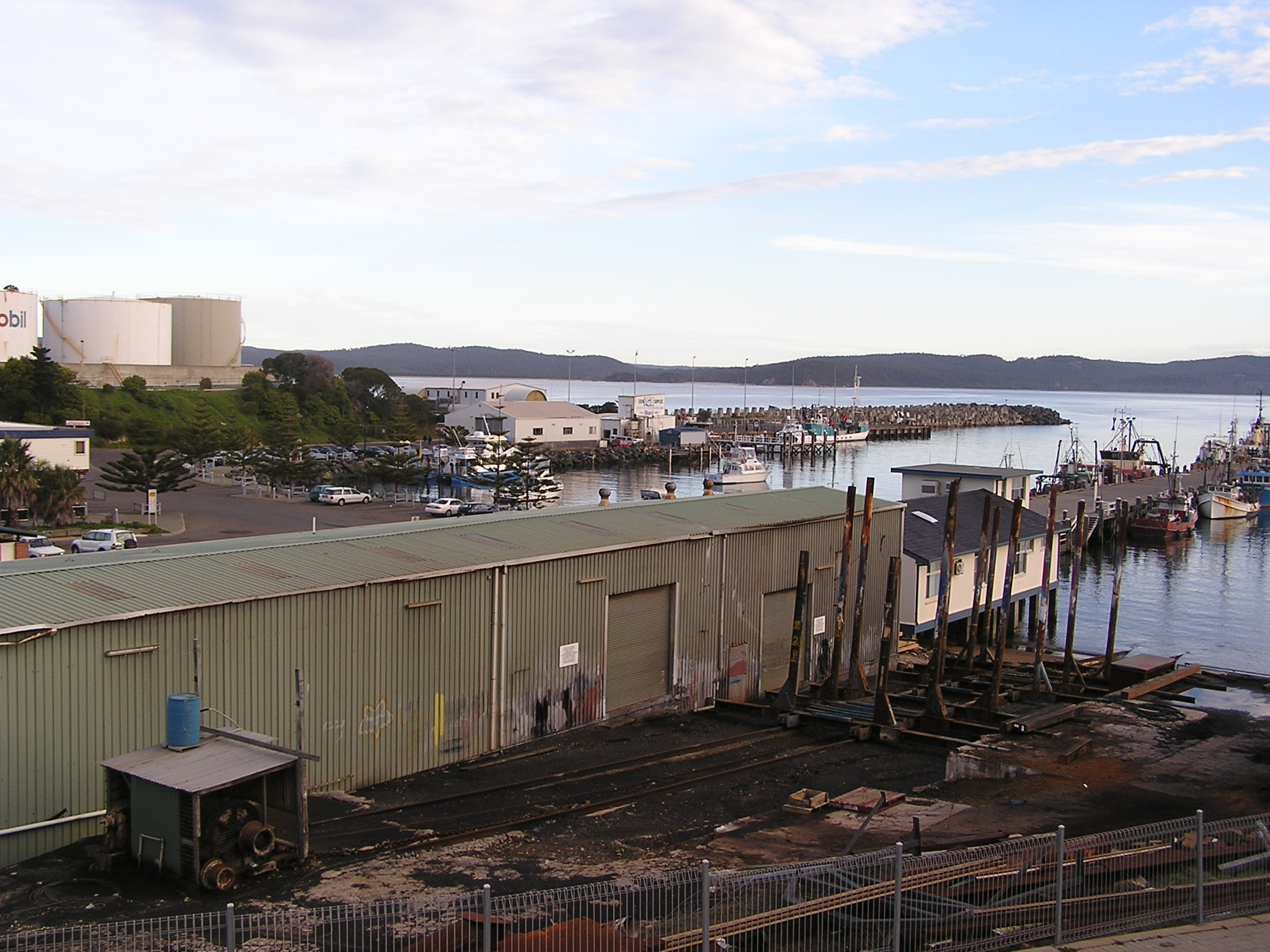
Port showing slipway

== See also ==
- List of ports in Australia
