= Newcastle Port Corporation =

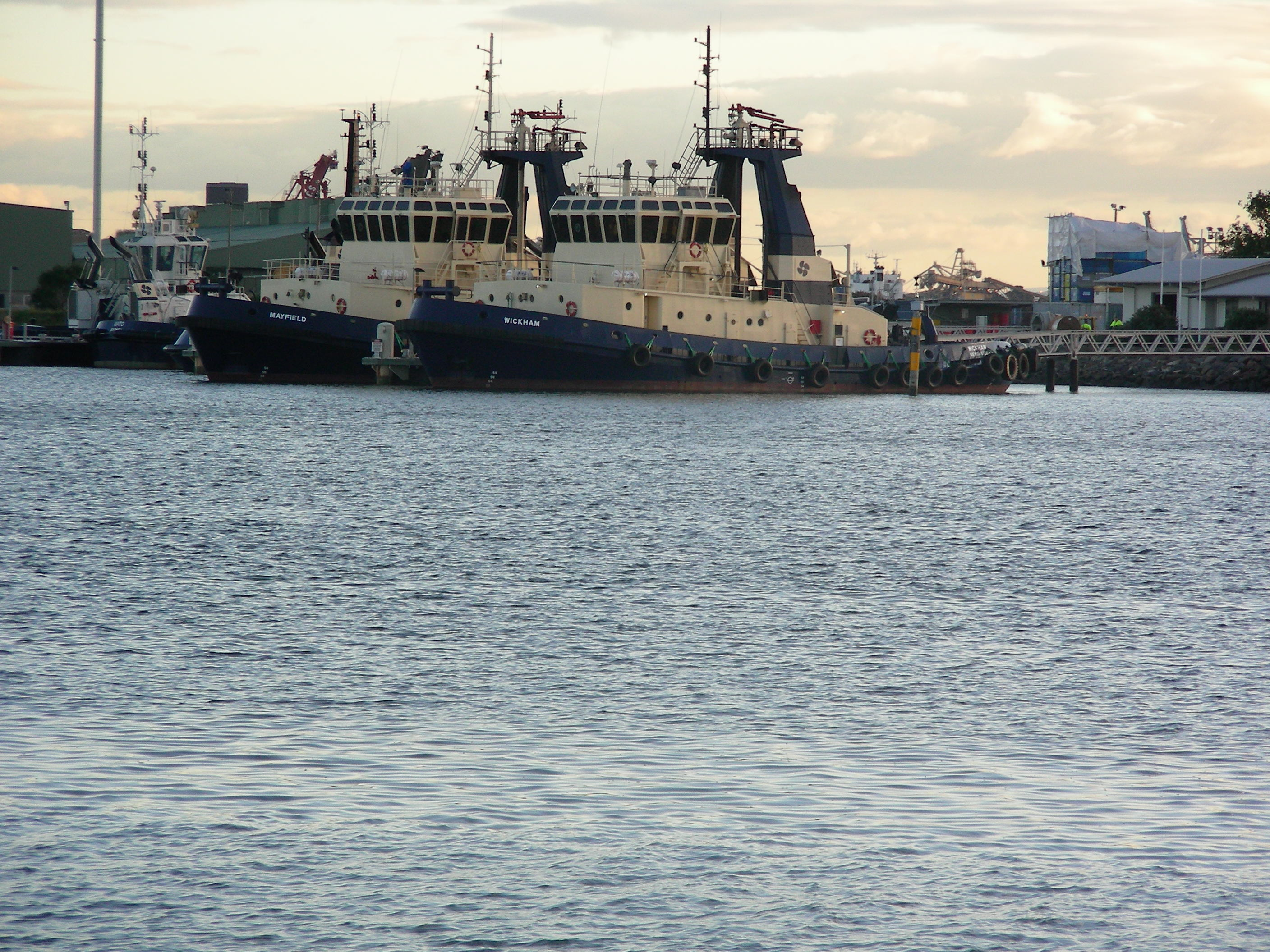
Newcastle Harbour -c

Newcastle Port Corporation may refer to:

- the Port of Newcastle, Australia
- the Newcastle Port Corporation, New South Wales which was amalgamated into the Port Authority of New South Wales
- the Port of Tyne, near Newcastle upon Tyne, United Kingdom
