= PS William the Fourth =

54-ton wooden paddle steamer

History

Australia
- Owner: Joseph Hickey Grose, Sydney (1831-1839); Brisbane Water Steam Packet Company (1839); General Steam Navigation Company (1839-1842); Edye Manning & Ors (1942-1843); James Byrnes, Parramatta (1843-1844); John Dobbie & D Bloxome (1844-1850); William M Manning & A B Spark (1850-1857); Grafton Steam Navigation Company (1857-1858); William M & Edye Manning (1858-1859); Illawarra Steam Navigation Company (1859-1864)
- Launched: 1831
- Fate: Unknown
- Notes: Last recorded in 1868

General characteristics
- Type: Paddle Steamer
- Tons burthen: 57 tons (1831); 77 tons (1853)
- Length: 74 ft 0 in (22.56 m) (1831); 86 ft 0 in (26.21 m) (1853)
- Beam: 15 ft 6 in (4.72 m) (1831); 14 ft 8 in (4.47 m) (1853)
- Draught: 7 ft 0 in (2.13 m) (1831); 8 ft 2 in (2.49 m) (1853)
- Installed power: Steam engines by Fawcett, Liverpool
- Sail plan: 2 masts

William the Fourth was a 54-ton wooden paddle steamer built by Marshall & Lowe, Erringhi (now Clarence Town), New South Wales, Australia. She was the first oceangoing steamship built in Australia when launched in 1831. She was rebuilt and lengthened in 1853. She plied the East Coast of New South Wales until 1863, when she sailed to China and was sold and operated on the Shanghai–Ningbo route. Records end in 1868 when she sailed to Japan.

== Replica ==
A replica was built at Raymond Terrace from 1985 to 1987 as part of the Australian Bicentenary and was launched by Hazel Hawke on 26 September 1987.
