= Tathra, New South Wales =

Tathra
- Town
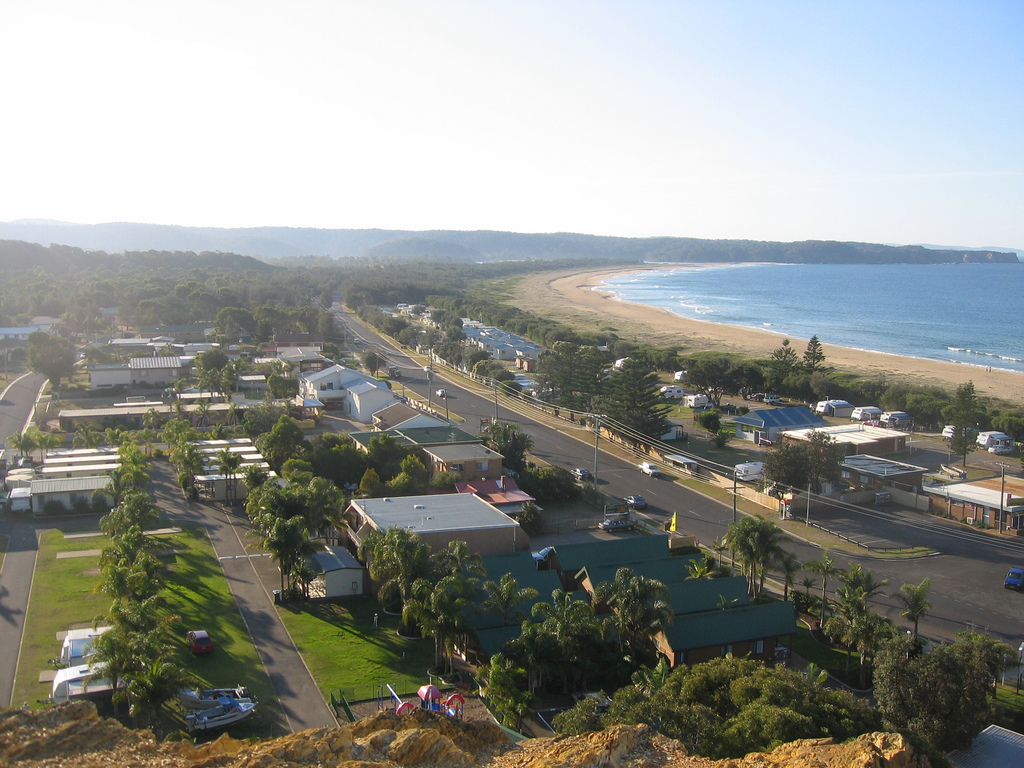
- Tathra, New South Wales

- Interactive map of Tathra
- Coordinates: 36°43′40″S 149°58′52″E
- Country: Australia
- State: New South Wales
- LGA: Bega Valley Shire
- Location: 424 km (263 mi) SSW of Sydney; 17.8 km (11.1 mi) SE of Bega; 242 km (150 mi) SE of Canberra; 43.8 km (27.2 mi) S of Bermagui; 50.4 km (31.3 mi) N of Eden

Government
  - State electorate: Bega
  - Federal division: Eden-Monaro
- Elevation: 44 m (144 ft)

Population
  - Total: 1,675 (2016 census)
- Postcode: 2550
- Mean max temp: 41.3 °C (106.3 °F)
- Mean min temp: 4.3 °C (39.7 °F)
Localities around Tathra
Bega	Chinnock
Kalaru	Tathra
Wallagoot	Merimbula	Eden

Tathra (/tɑːθrə/) is a seaside town on the Sapphire Coast found on the South Coast, New South Wales, Australia. As of the 2016 census census, Tathra had a population of 1,675.

Nearby points of interest are the Old Tathra Wharf, Mimosa Rocks National Park and Bournda National Park. Mimosa Rocks National Park starts at the northern end of Tathra Beach and runs north for about 16 km. It has five access roads from the Tathra-Bermagui main road. Bournda National Park starts at Kianinny Bay, at the southern end of Tathra, and runs south for about 13 kilometres (8.1 mi). There is a walking track near the coast, along most of its length.

The Bega River flows into the sea at the northern end of Tathra Beach, which is about 3 kilometres (1.9 mi) long.

Tathra is said to mean "beautiful country" or "place of wild cats" in a local Aboriginal dialect.

== History ==
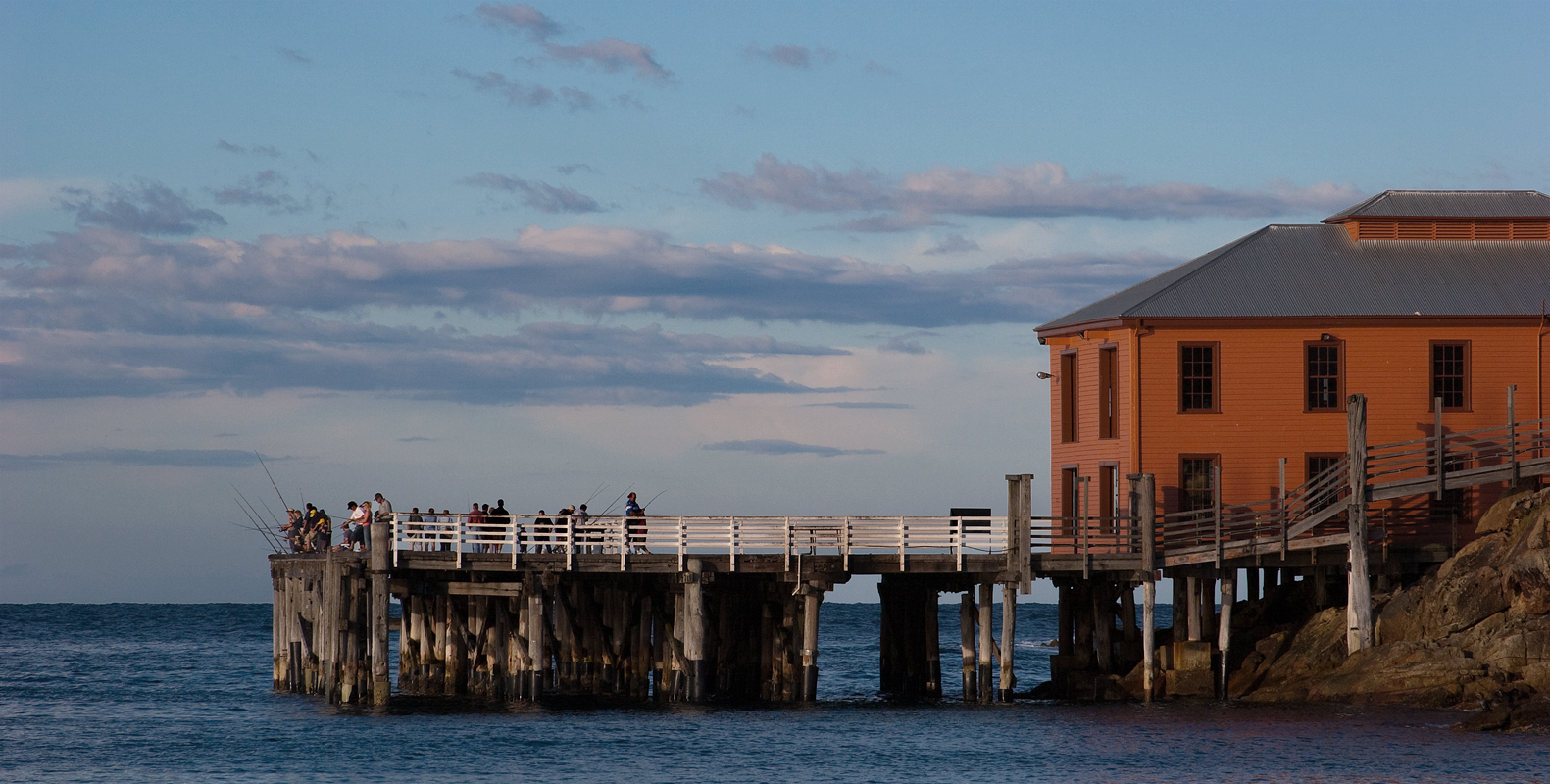
Tathra wharf

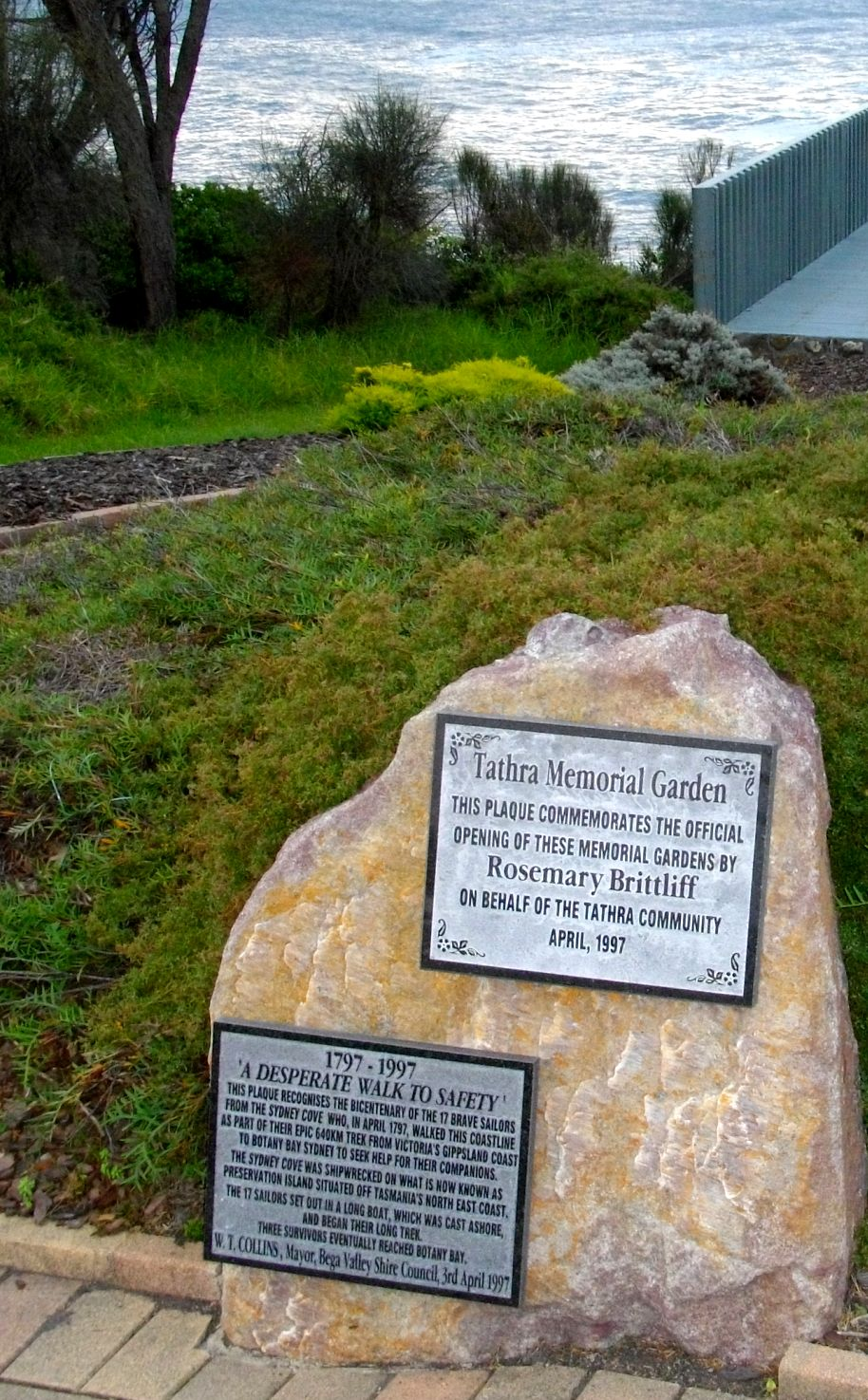
In Tathra's seaside Memorial Gardens, a plaque commemorates the bicentenary of a tragic trek by survivors of a shipwreck.

The Tathra area lies within the traditional lands of the Djiringanj people, a group of the Yuin. The headland at Tathra is the site of a shell midden, which indicates it was a place favoured by the original inhabitants and a source of food.

Tathra was first settled by Europeans in the 1820s and 1830s, although it was outside the limits of a legal settlement, the Nineteen Counties. After a period of dispossession from much of their lands and coexistence with the settlers in the Bega Valley, the Aboriginal population was removed to the Wallaga Lake Aboriginal Reserve, under the control of the Aborigines Protection Board of New South Wales.

A small jetty was built at Tathra in the early 19th century. In 1861–62, a larger wharf was built from funds donated by farmers and the Illawarra Steam Navigation Company. Regular shipping commenced in 1862. The wharf, built on turpentine supports set into solid rock, was restored by the National Trust, Department of Planning, and local residents. It is the only remaining coastal steamer wharf in NSW.

In 1943, a local Volunteer Fire Brigade was established. In 2011 the Commissioner of the NSW Rural Fire Service opened a new station next to the older Station which had been in place since the early 1970s. In December 2020 the town's Fire Station received a major upgrade including the addition of a dedicated training and meeting room which featured the latest in modern technology including video conferencing. Tathra Fire Brigade is now one of the most well-equipped brigades on the Far South Coast and with weekly training, it has also come to be one of the most active brigades.

As with the Fire Brigade, the town also has a Surf Life Saving Club.

In 2008 two children fell from the wharf. Their father jumped in to attempt their rescue, but all three drowned.

On the morning of 3 April 2014, Christine Armstrong, a member of the Tathra Surf Life Saving Club was taken by a shark believed to be approximately 4 metres (13 ft) long. Armstrong was swimming between Tathra Wharf and the Tathra Beach with a group of friends and her husband Rob. The shark was never located. This attack is believed to be the first attack in around 100 years and is extremely odd as Tathra rarely sees Sharks close to the Bay.

In September 2019, significant repairs were undertaken on the Tathra Wharf in following extensive damage caused by rough ocean conditions And followed By extensive Repairs From 2023-2025

=== 2018 bushfires ===
On 18 March 2018, a bushfire began in the locality of Reedy Swamp, near Tarraganda, which spread east towards Tathra. By the evening the fire had reached the town, destroying homes and blocking one of only two roads out of the town. Around 130 homes were either destroyed or damaged. An emergency evacuation centre for people affected by the fire was set up at the Bega Showgrounds. On 19 March (Monday), multiple schools in the area were closed due to students and staff being affected by the fire, namely Bega High School, Tathra Public School, Tanja Public School and the Bournda Environmental Education Centre. As of 10:40pm on the 18th 1,000 hectares had been burnt. By the morning of 19 March up to 70 buildings were believed to have been lost, and more than 200 people sought shelter at the Bega evacuation centre. On the afternoon of the 19th, the New South Wales Rural Fire Service (RFS) confirmed that 69 homes were destroyed and 39 were damaged, and 398 houses were saved or untouched. The RFS has stated that the total number of buildings destroyed is most likely 'seventy-plus'. NSW Premier Gladys Berejiklian, Bega state MP Andrew Constance, federal MP Mike Kelly and Prime Minister Malcolm Turnbull visited Tathra soon after the fire and met with evacuated people at the Bega Showgrounds.

== Heritage listings ==
Tathra has a number of heritage-listed sites, including:

- Wharf Road: Tathra Wharf

== Transport ==
Tathra Road connects the regional centre of Bega 18 km to the west. Until the early 21st century, Tathra Road was known as the Snowy Mountains Highway, which now runs between Bega and the Hume Highway via Cooma and Tumut.

The Sapphire Coast Drive connects Tathra with Merimbula 25 km to the south and Tathra-Bermagui Road connects to the fishing port of Bermagui 44 km to the north.

Tathra is served by the local Bus Company Sapphire Coast Bus Lines. Sapphire Coast Bus Lines purchased the runs from the Daly family early 2013. The Daly Family operated the Bus Services from 1982 under the name of Tathra Bus Service.
