= Tathra Wharf =

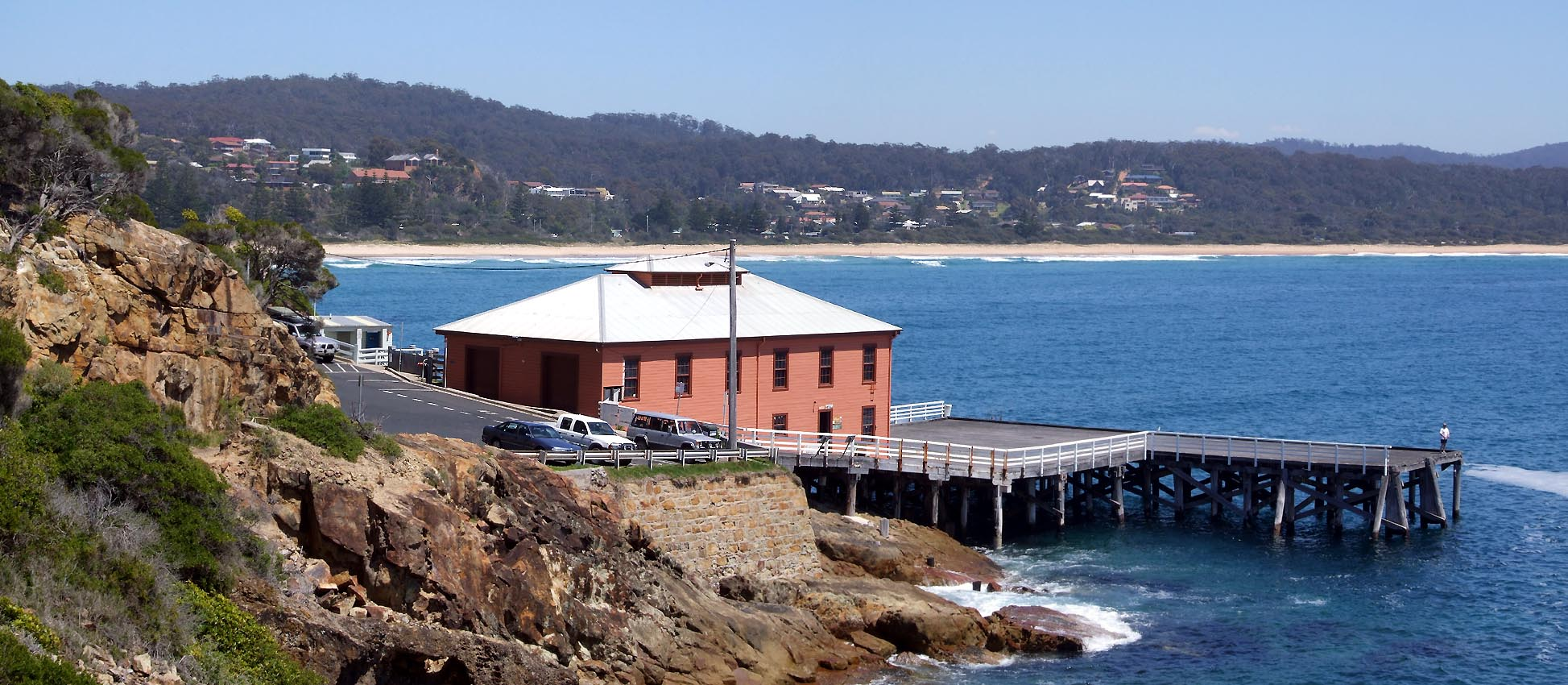

- Location within New South Wales Location within Australia
- 36.7256°S 149.9888°E
- Location: Wharf Road, Tathra, Bega Valley Shire, New South Wales, Australia

History
- Built: 1860–1862

Site notes
- Owner: Department of Planning and Infrastructure

New South Wales Heritage Register
- Official name: Tathra Wharf and building
- Type: state heritage (built)
- Designated: 2 April 1999
- Reference no.: 405
- Type: Wharf
- Category: Transport - Water

Tathra Wharf is a heritage-listed former wharf precinct and now museum and cafe at Wharf Road, Tathra, Bega Valley Shire, New South Wales, Australia. It was built from 1860 to 1862. The property is owned by the Department of Planning and Infrastructure (State Government). It was added to the New South Wales State Heritage Register on 2 April 1999.

== History ==
The first wharf at Tathra (not Kianinny) was constructed around 1860-1861 and was in the form of a simple jetty projecting into the ocean. It was known as the Farmer's Sea Wharf. This structure was quickly superseded in 1861–1862 with the erection of a new wharf built over the earlier structure. It was constructed from turpentine timber brought down from the north coast. The structure was consequently extended in 1873, 1878, 1886, 1889 up to the turn of the century. There is a record of two sheds being erected on the early wharf of which there are no remains but drawings prepared by the Department of Public Works survive.

The wharf was built in response to the need for coastal shipping after the commencement of the Illawarra and South Coast Steam Navigation Company in 1858. The first cargo vessel to call at Tathra was in 1858. It moored offshore and the cargo was transported by small boat from a location known as Kangarutha. A store shed was constructed there in the same year and an access road a year later. The following year Kianinni was discovered to be more sheltered for loading and a store was built there. Cargo was still shipped from the beach by small boat to vessels moored in the bay.

During the early period of the wharf Public Works records show that significant repairs were carried out to the wharf structure including re-piling and change of location of piles as techniques of piling improved. The changes and increase in size of the wharf can also be clearly related to increased shipping needs, larger ships visiting the wharf and the need for deeper mooring.

The wharf and buildings continued to be extended after the turn of the century. The cattle and pig yards were added in 1901, the wharf was again extended in 1903 and the buildings reconstructed with the present two storey structure in 1907. At this time a major upgrade took place with the introduction of spring-loaded wrought iron buffers to assist in the berthing of larger vessels in the difficult north-easterly seas to which the wharf was exposed. This was in conjunction with a mooring buoy to the north east of the jetty. When ships berthed at the wharf they would drop anchor to the north west of the wharf and attach a spring line from the mooring buoy and from these would spring against the buffers in front of the wharf.

The position of the wharf was selected as it was the most protected position in the area particularly from the south.

Between 1907 and 1912 the wharf underwent major extensions in 8 definable stages including a sub-deck, jib crane, the addition of the cattle race, loading ramp and passenger shelter.

In 1919 the passenger shelter was replaced by a single storey shed abutting the two story building. This correlated with the decline in passenger transport by sea and the concentration on freight and cargo. With the advent of road transport further decline in shipping took place. The south coast was however one of the last areas to see the effects of other forms of transport as there was no adjacent railway line to carry bulk freight from the area to Sydney. The last ship to take freight from Tathra was in 1954.

For the next twenty years the wharf was used for fishing and local vessels until its demolition was ordered in 1973. This was opposed by the local community and with support from the National Trust of Australia (NSW) who launched a $200,000 appeal for its restoration, the wharf was saved through conservation work taking place through to 1988. The State Government contributed $50,000 and the federal government a further $29,000 towards conservation works. In 1978 the wharf was vested in a new Trust, the Tathra Wharf Trust, which comprises representatives of Imlay Shire Council, Bega Municipal Council and the National Trust of Australia (NSW). The restoration project was supervised by the National Trust of Australia (NSW)'s consulting engineer, Colin Crisp.

The wharf was restored in the 1980s and officially reopened in 1988.

A Federal Heritage CHPP grant of $155,000 was awarded in 2002-03 for works to the wharf and reserve site. The piers, bearers and platform were replaced in 2006 using the original spotted gum or turpentine timbers, and the roof was also renovated at this time.

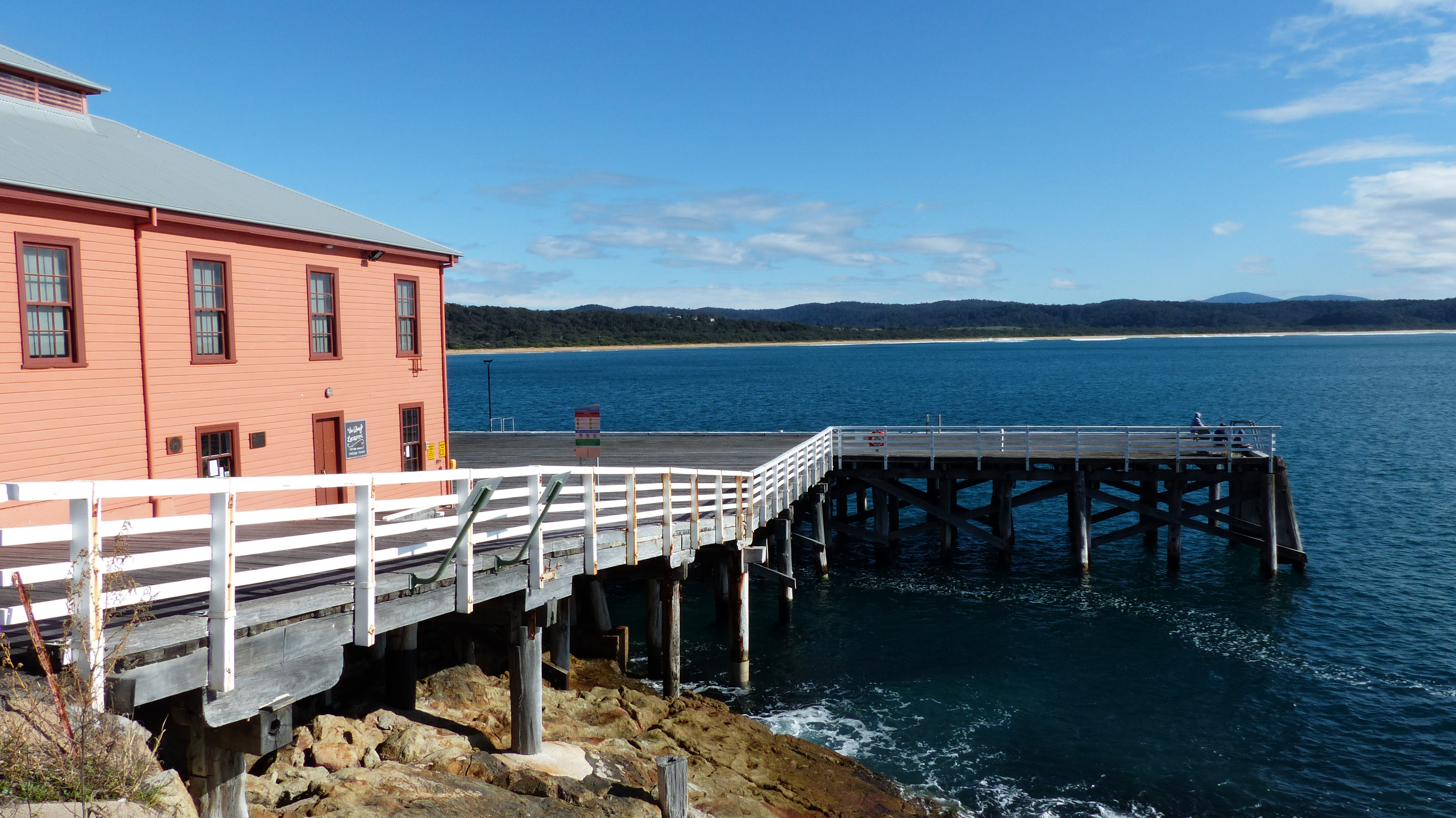
Tathra wharf

The wharf buildings were damaged in a major storm in June 2016, resulting in the closure of the cafe for six months while repairs were undertaken.

The 2018 Tathra bushfire came within metres of the wharf precinct, but left the site unaffected.

The restored wharf buildings now host the Tathra Wharf Museum and a cafe.

== Description ==
The basic structure consists of timber decking and super-structure supported on timber piles to a rock sea bed to a maximum depth of 25 ft. At the inshore end the structure terminates on a stone and concrete retaining wall finishing well above mean highwater. Carried on the western half of the wharf are two timber-framed structures. The original two storey shed is at the landward end and the single storey shed built about the turn of the century abuts the larger shed at the seaward side. The large timber shed contains interesting roof trusses with a monitor scissor truss. All timbers are put together with traditional jointing and metal fasteners. Both the wharf and the sheds include robust timber construction with a high standard of craftsmanship typical of the period.

The site on which the wharf stands is a small promontory which gives extended views up and down the coast but particularly to the north. The headland is largely parkland with a roadway leading down to the wharf from the west and the remains of another road partly washed away by heavy seas but with an easier gradient leading to the wharf from the east.

The wharf is situated on the north side of the headland to provide protection from the south. The wharf structure is sited on a rock platform that gently slopes into the ocean providing support for the piers.

The physical condition was reported as being excellent as at 1 October 1997. The archaeological potential was reported as being low.

== Heritage listing ==
Tathra Wharf is the only wharf and building combination surviving on the eastern seaboard of Australia from the period of the coastal shipping trade dating from the 1860s. The connection between the wharf structure and the towns of Tathra, Bega and the surrounding district is important in understanding the history of the growth and development of the area. It is an excellent example of a marine building constructed entirely from hardwood and built in one period. It has consistency in detailing and construction. The structures retain most of their original setting on the headland and can be viewed in the same way as when the wharf was operating. The building and wharf structure demonstrates construction technology from the 1860s through to the 1950s

Tathra Wharf and building was listed on the New South Wales State Heritage Register on 2 April 1999 having satisfied the following criteria.

The place is important in demonstrating the course, or pattern, of cultural or natural history in New South Wales.

Tathra Wharf is the only wharf and building combination surviving on the eastern seaboard of Australia from the period of the coastal shipping trade dating from the 1860s. The building is in a form that is very close to the early form of the building and clearly demonstrates how the wharf complex operated. The connection between the wharf structure and the towns of Tathra, Bega and surrounding district is important in understanding the history of the growth and development of the area.

The place is important in demonstrating aesthetic characteristics and/or a high degree of creative or technical achievement in New South Wales.

It is an excellent example of a marine building constructed entirely from hardwood and built in one period. It has consistency in detailing and construction. The structures retain most of their original setting on the headland and can be viewed in the same way as when the wharf was operating.

The place has strong or special association with a particular community or cultural group in New South Wales for social, cultural or spiritual reasons.

The structures and site are of social significance in the development of the Bega/Tathra area, particularly as the development of Tathra is due to the port facility and all life in the town centered around it for almost one hundred years.

The place has potential to yield information that will contribute to an understanding of the cultural or natural history of New South Wales.

The building and wharf structure demonstrates construction technology from the 1860s through to the 1950s.

The place possesses uncommon, rare or endangered aspects of the cultural or natural history of New South Wales.

Tathra Wharf is the only wharf and building combination surviving on the eastern seaboard of Australia from the period of the coastal shipping trade dating from the 1860s.

The place is important in demonstrating the principal characteristics of a class of cultural or natural places/environments in New South Wales.

The structures are representative of many similar wharves built along the coast over a considerable period of time that represented a way of transport and life that has now disappeared.

== Engineering heritage award ==
The wharf is listed as a National Engineering Landmark by Engineers Australia as part of its Engineering Heritage Recognition Program.
