= Bournda National Park =

Protected area in New South Wales, Australia

- IUCN category II (national park)
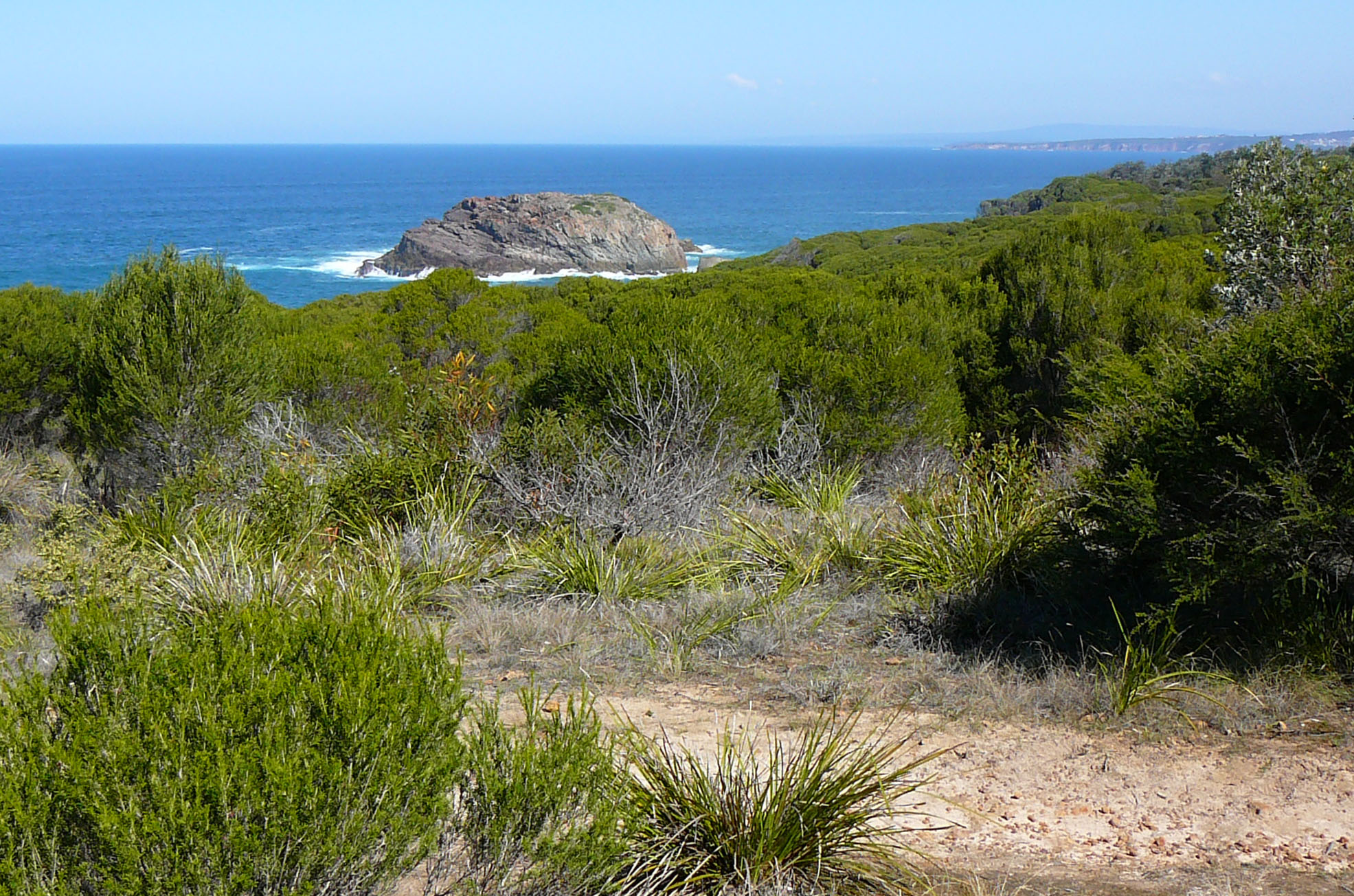

- Location within New South Wales
- Location: New South Wales
- Nearest city: Tathra
- Coordinates: 36°28′36″S 149°55′07″E
- Area: 2,655 ha (10.25 sq mi)
- Established: 6 September 1947
- Governing body: New South Wales National Parks and Wildlife Service
- Website: http://www.nationalparks.nsw.gov.au/visit-a-park/parks/Bournda-National-Park

The Bournda National Park is a 2,655-hectare (6,560-acre) protected area in New South Wales, Australia, managed as a national park by NSW National Parks and Wildlife Service, and was established on 24 April 1992. It forms part of the Ulladulla to Merimbula Important Bird Area, identified as such by BirdLife International because of its importance for swift parrots.

== Description ==
The park is 343 km south of Sydney near Tathra. Bournda National Park spans from Kianinny Bay, on the southern side of Tathra, south for about 13 km. There is a good walking track, along the coast for most of its length.

The park is host to three main bodies of water. Wallagoot Lake is a large salt water lake that last opened up to the ocean in June 2008. Bondi Lake is of ecological significance as it is the closest fresh water lake to the ocean in the region. Finally, Bournda Lagoon is a brackish (half salt water / half fresh water) lagoon that is periodically open to the ocean. The lagoon is a popular swimming spot for locals and campers alike. Good camping facilities are available at the Hobart Beach camp ground.

The park was once a State Recreation Area and became a National Park in 1992. Adjacent to the park is the Bournda Nature Reserve, which was established in 1972 and is 6,088 ha in size. Both areas are included in the management plan by the National Parks and Wildlife Service.

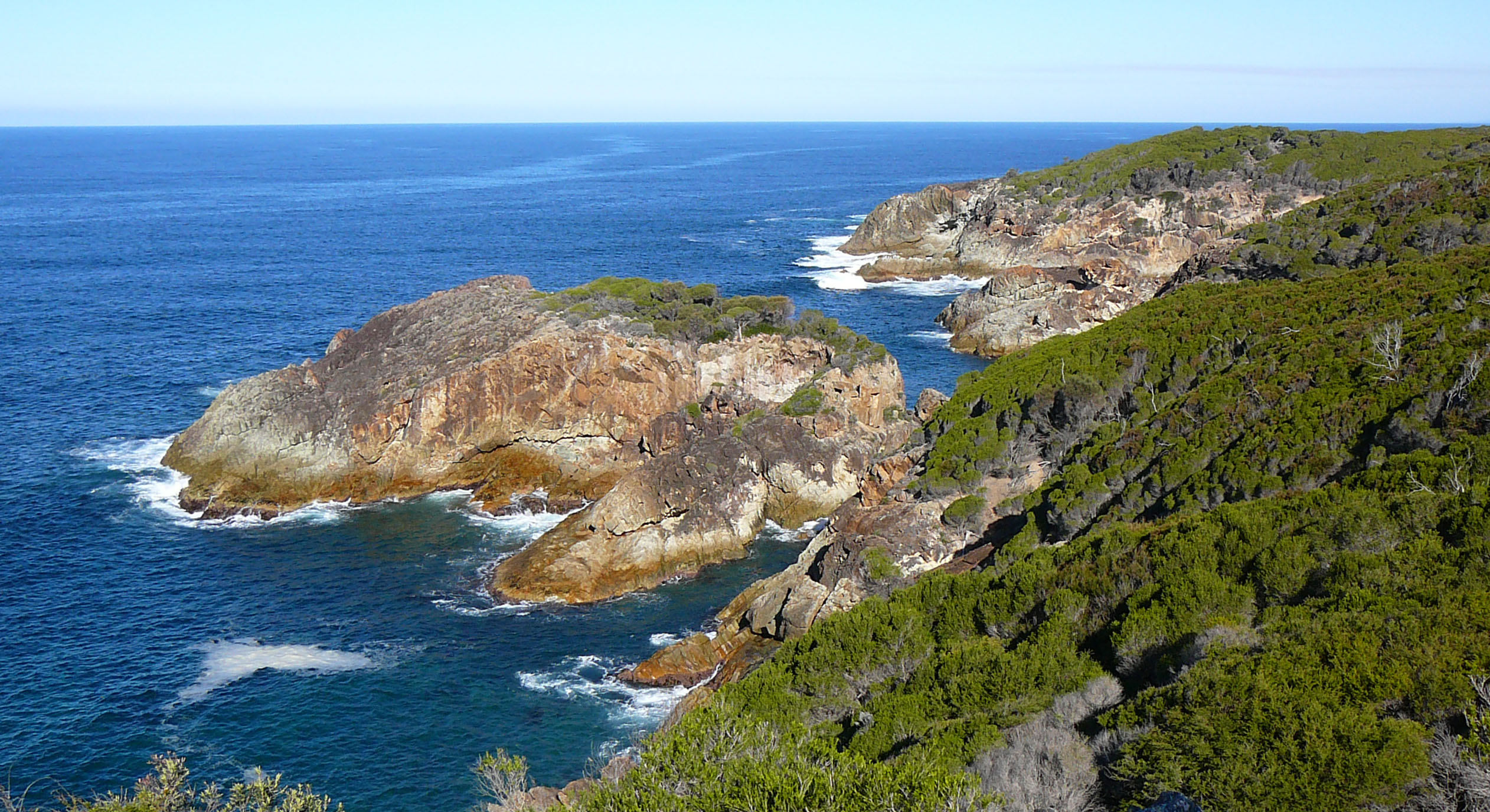
Bournda National Park from above Kianinny Bay.

=== Walking tracks ===
- Hobart Beach to Bournda Lagoon – 2.6 km
- Hobart Beach to Scotts Bay – 1.3 km
- Hobart Beach to Tathra via the Kangarutha Track – 12.0 km
- Bournda Lagoon round trip via Bournda Island – 6.0 km

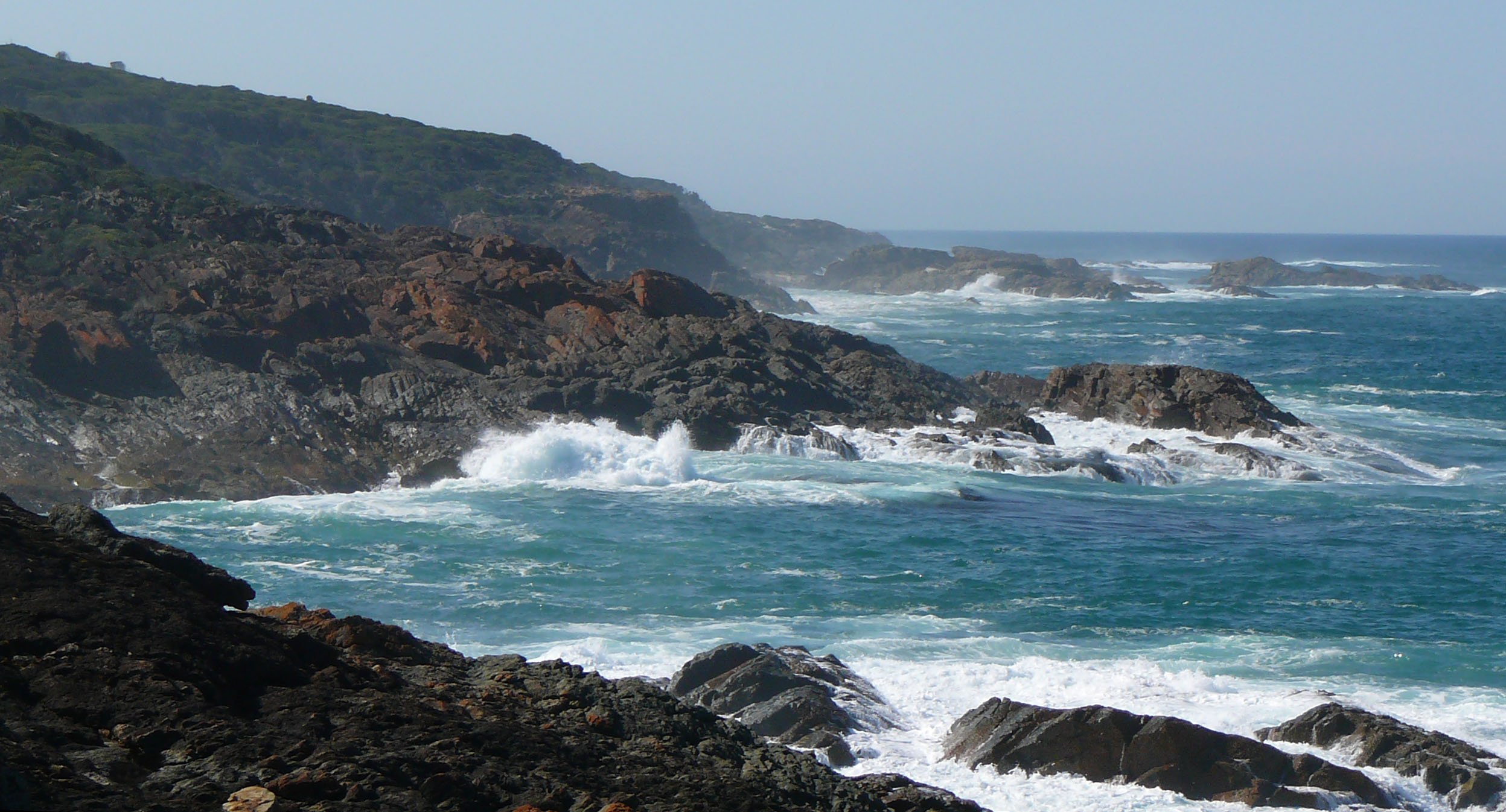
The southern coastline

== See also ==
- Protected areas of New South Wales
