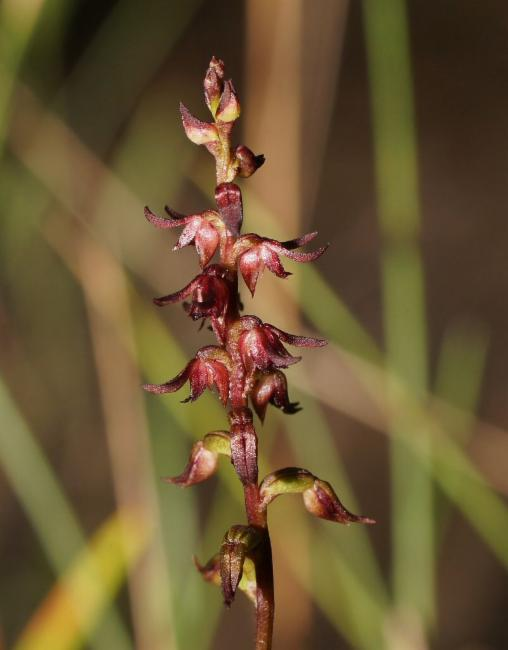
- At Falls Creek

Scientific classification
- Kingdom: Plantae
- Clade: Tracheophytes
- Clade: Angiosperms
- Clade: Monocots
- Order: Asparagales
- Family: Orchidaceae
- Subfamily: Orchidoideae
- Tribe: Diurideae
- Genus: Genoplesium
- Species: G. laminatum

Binomial name
- Genoplesium laminatum Fitzg. M.A.M.Renner

Synonyms
- Corunastylis laminata (Fitzg.) D.L.Jones & M.A.Clem.; Prasophyllum laminatum Fitzg.

= Genoplesium laminatum =

Red midge orchid

Species of orchid

Genoplesium laminatum, commonly known as the red midge orchid, is a small terrestrial orchid endemic to New South Wales. It has a single thin leaf fused to the flowering stem and up to twenty bright reddish flowers. It grows in heath and grassy forest in a few places on the South Coast and Central Tablelands.

== Description ==
Genoplesium laminatum is a terrestrial, perennial, deciduous, herb with an underground tuber and a single thin leaf 100–150 mm (4–6 in) long and fused to the flowering stem with the free part 10–15 mm (0.4–0.6 in) long. Between five and twenty bright reddish flowers are arranged along a flowering stem 15–25 mm (0.6–1 in) long. The flowers lean downwards slightly and are 4–5 mm (0.16–0.20 in) long and 5–5.5 mm (0.20–0.22 in) wide. As with others in the genus, the flowers are inverted so that the labellum is above the column rather than below it. The dorsal sepal is about 3 mm (0.1 in) long and 2 mm (0.08 in) wide with hairless edges and darker coloured bands. The lateral sepals are 3–3.5 mm (0.12–0.14 in) long, about 1 mm (0.04 in) wide, turn downwards, with a humped base and a sharply pointed tip. There is sometimes a small gland on the tip of the lateral sepals. The petals are 2–2.5 mm (0.08–0.1 in) long, about 1 mm (0.04 in) wide with hairless edges. The labellum is oblong to egg-shaped with the narrower end towards the base, about 2.5 mm (0.1 in) long and 1 mm (0.04 in) wide and fleshy. There is a broad, tapering callus in the centre of the labellum and extending nearly to its tip. Flowering occurs from January to May.

== Taxonomy and naming ==
The red midge orchid was first formally described in 1885 by Robert D. FitzGerald who gave it the name Prasophyllum laminatum and published the description in Journal of Botany, British and Foreign. In 2019, Matthew Renner changed the name to Genoplesium laminatum and the name is accepted by Plants of the World Online. The specific epithet (laminatum) is derived from the Latin word lamina meaning "a thin plate", "blade" or "sheet".

== Distribution and habitat ==
Genoplesium laminatum grows in heathy or grassy forest between Jervis Bay and Bowral.
