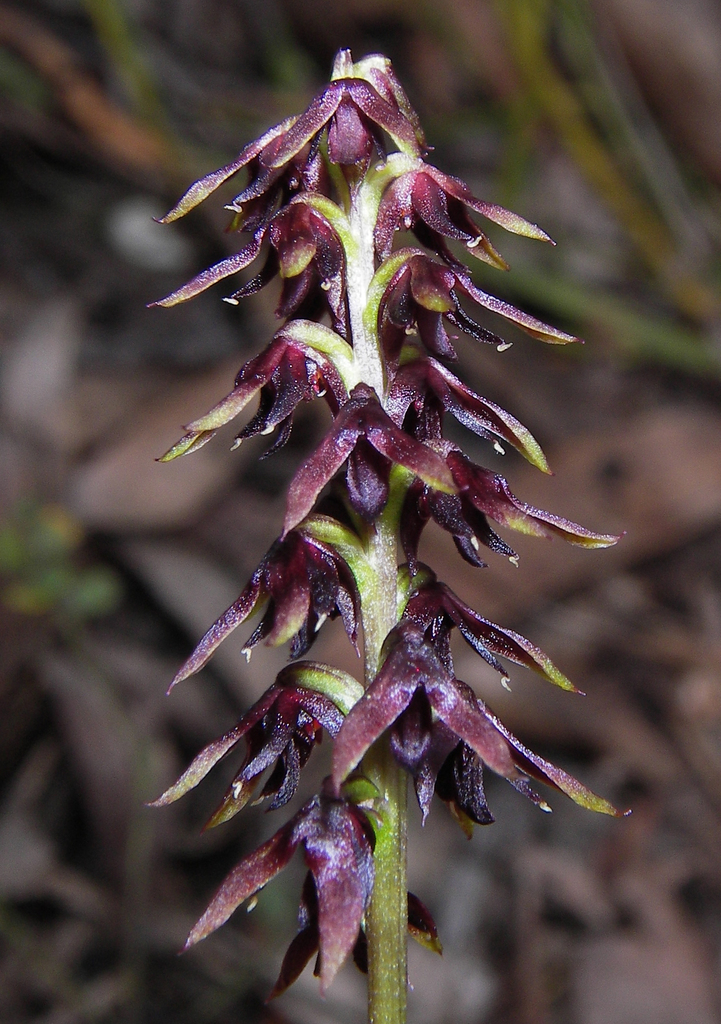
- In Washpool National Park

Scientific classification
- Kingdom: Plantae
- Clade: Embryophytes
- Clade: Tracheophytes
- Clade: Angiosperms
- Clade: Monocots
- Order: Asparagales
- Family: Orchidaceae
- Subfamily: Orchidoideae
- Tribe: Diurideae
- Genus: Genoplesium
- Species: G. bishopii

Binomial name
- Genoplesium bishopii D.L.Jones

Synonyms
- Corunastylis bishopii (D.L.Jones) D.L.Jones & M.A.Clem.

= Genoplesium bishopii =

Gibraltar Range midge orchid

Species of orchid

Genoplesium bishopii, commonly known as Gibraltar Range midge orchid, is a small terrestrial orchid endemic to New South Wales. It has a single thin leaf fused to the flowering stem and up to thirty small, dark purplish red flowers. It grows in heathy forest and on the edges of swamps in the Gibraltar Range National Park.

== Description ==
Genoplesium bishopii is a terrestrial, perennial, deciduous, herb with an underground tuber and a single thin leaf 150–200 mm (6–8 in) long and fused to the flowering stem with the free part 10–15 mm (0.4–0.6 in) long. Between fifteen and thirty dark purplish red flowers are crowded along a flowering stem 30–50 mm (1–2 in) tall and taller than the leaf. The flowers are 5–6 mm (0.20–0.24 in) long and 4–5 mm (0.16–0.20 in) wide and lean forward. As with others in the genus, the flowers are inverted so that the labellum is above the column rather than below it. The dorsal sepal is about 4 mm (0.16 in) long and 2 mm (0.08 in) wide with hairless edges and a sharply pointed tip. The lateral sepals are about 5 mm (0.2 in) long, 1–1.5 mm (0.04–0.06 in) wide, turn downwards and spread widely apart from each other. The petals are about 3 mm (0.1 in) long, 1 mm (0.04 in) wide with hairless edges and a small white gland on the tip. The labellum is 3–3.5 mm (0.12–0.14 in) long, 1.5 mm (0.06 in) wide, thick and fleshy with many short hairs on the sides. There is a callus in the centre of the labellum and extending nearly to its tip. Flowering occurs from November to January.

== Taxonomy and naming ==
Gibraltar Range midge orchid was first formally described in 2000 by David Jones who gave it the name Genoplesium bishopii and published the description in The Orchadian. In 2002, Jones and Mark Clements changed the name to Corunastylis bishopii but the change has not been accepted by the Australian Plant Census.

== Distribution and habitat ==
Genoplesium bishopii is only known from the Gibraltar Range National Park where it grows in heathy forest and on the edge of swamps.
