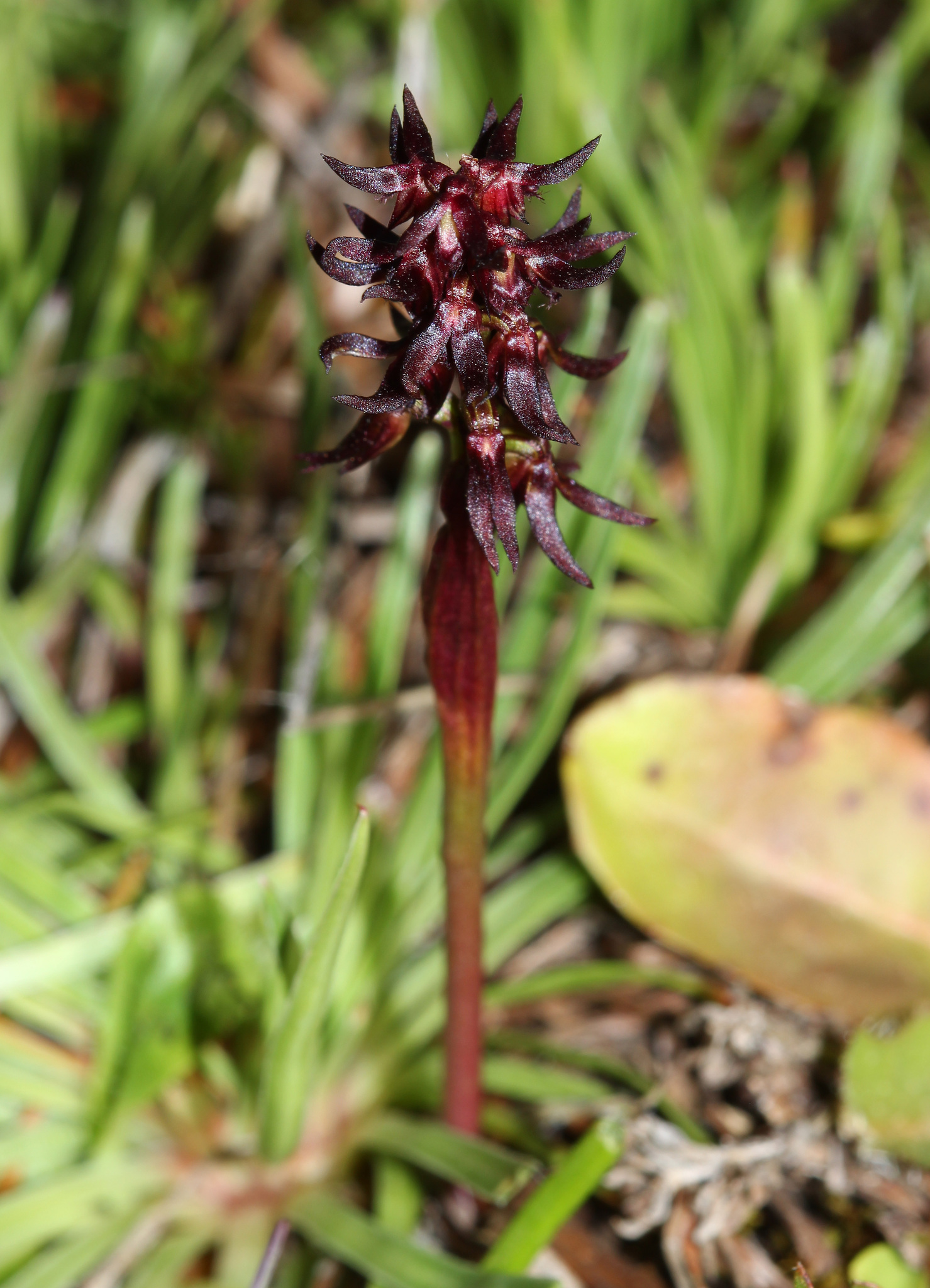

Scientific classification
- Kingdom: Plantae
- Clade: Tracheophytes
- Clade: Angiosperms
- Clade: Monocots
- Order: Asparagales
- Family: Orchidaceae
- Subfamily: Orchidoideae
- Tribe: Diurideae
- Genus: Genoplesium
- Species: G. turfosum

Binomial name
- Genoplesium turfosum D.L.Jones

Synonyms
- Corunastylis turfosa (D.L.Jones) D.L.Jones & M.A.Clem.

= Genoplesium turfosum =

Alpine midge orchid

Species of orchid

Genoplesium turfosum, commonly known as the alpine midge orchid, is a small terrestrial orchid endemic to a small area in the higher parts of New South Wales. It has a single thin leaf fused to the flowering stem and up to twenty five dark purplish-red, crowded flowers with a sparsely hairy labellum.

== Description ==
Genoplesium turfosum is a terrestrial, perennial, deciduous, herb with an underground tuber and a single thin leaf with a purplish base and 50–130 mm (2–5 in) long, fused to the flowering stem with the free part 8–12 mm (0.3–0.5 in) long. Between two and twenty five flowers are crowded along a flowering stem 8–20 mm (0.3–0.8 in) long, reaching to a height 60–150 mm (2–6 in). The flowers lean downwards, are dark purplish-red and about 4 mm (0.2 in) wide. As with others in the genus, the flowers are inverted so that the labellum is above the column rather than below it. The dorsal sepal is linear to egg-shaped, about 3.5 mm (0.1 in) long, 2 mm (0.08 in) wide and reddish-purple with darker bands. The lateral sepals are linear to lance-shaped, about 4.5 mm (0.2 in) long, 1.5 mm (0.06 in) wide and spread widely apart from each other. The petals are linear to egg-shaped, about 3 mm (0.1 in) long and 1.5 mm (0.06 in) wide with dark bands. The labellum is linear to egg-shaped, 5.5–6 mm (0.22–0.24 in) long, about 3.5 mm (0.1 in) wide with a few coarse, blackish hairs up to 1.5 mm (0.06 in) long on its edges. There is a dark purplish-black callus in the centre of the labellum and extending almost to its tip. Flowering occurs in November and December.

== Taxonomy and naming ==
Genoplesium turfosum was first formally described in 1991 by David Jones and the description was published in Australian Orchid Research. In 2002, David Jones and Mark Clements changed the name to Corunastylis turfosa but the change is not accepted by the Australian Plant Census. The specific epithet (turfosum) is a Latin word meaning "peaty" or "boggy", referring to the habitat of this orchid.

== Distribution and habitat ==
The alpine midge orchid grows with dense sedges in boggy places in the Kosciuszko National Park.
