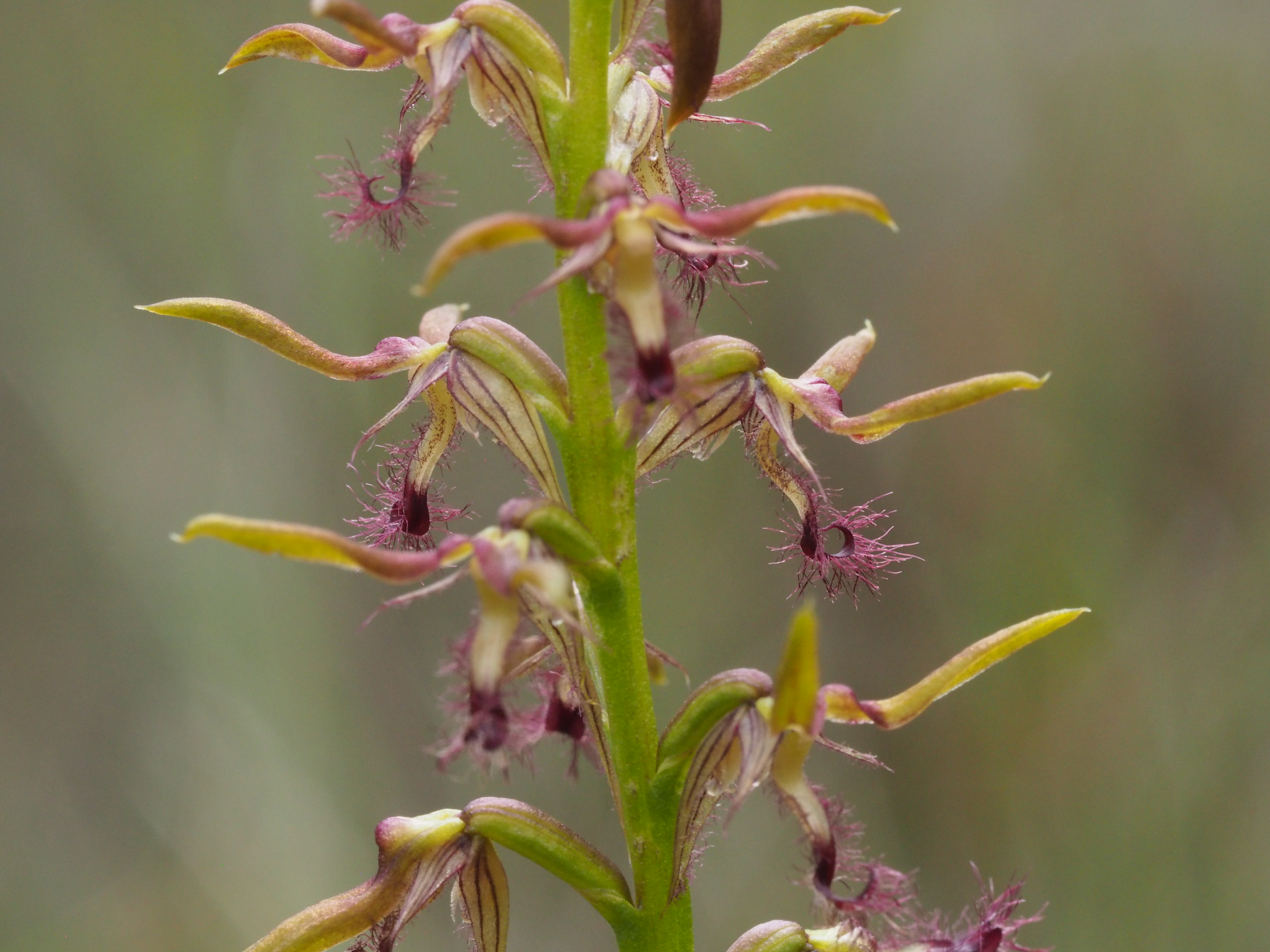
- Genoplesium fimbriatum in the Cathedral Rock National Park

Scientific classification
- Kingdom: Plantae
- Clade: Tracheophytes
- Clade: Angiosperms
- Clade: Monocots
- Order: Asparagales
- Family: Orchidaceae
- Subfamily: Orchidoideae
- Tribe: Diurideae
- Genus: Genoplesium
- Species: G. fimbriatum

Binomial name
- Genoplesium fimbriatum R.Br. D.L.Jones & M.A.Clem.

Synonyms
- Prasophyllum fimbriatum R.Br.; Corunastylis fimbriata (R.Br.) D.L.Jones & M.A.Clem.

= Genoplesium fimbriatum =

Fringed midge orchid

Species of orchid

Genoplesium fimbriatum, commonly known as the fringed midge orchid, is a small terrestrial orchid found from southern Queensland to southern New South Wales. It has a single thin leaf and up to thirty green to brownish-green flowers with red stripes and a red-tipped labellum with hairy edges.

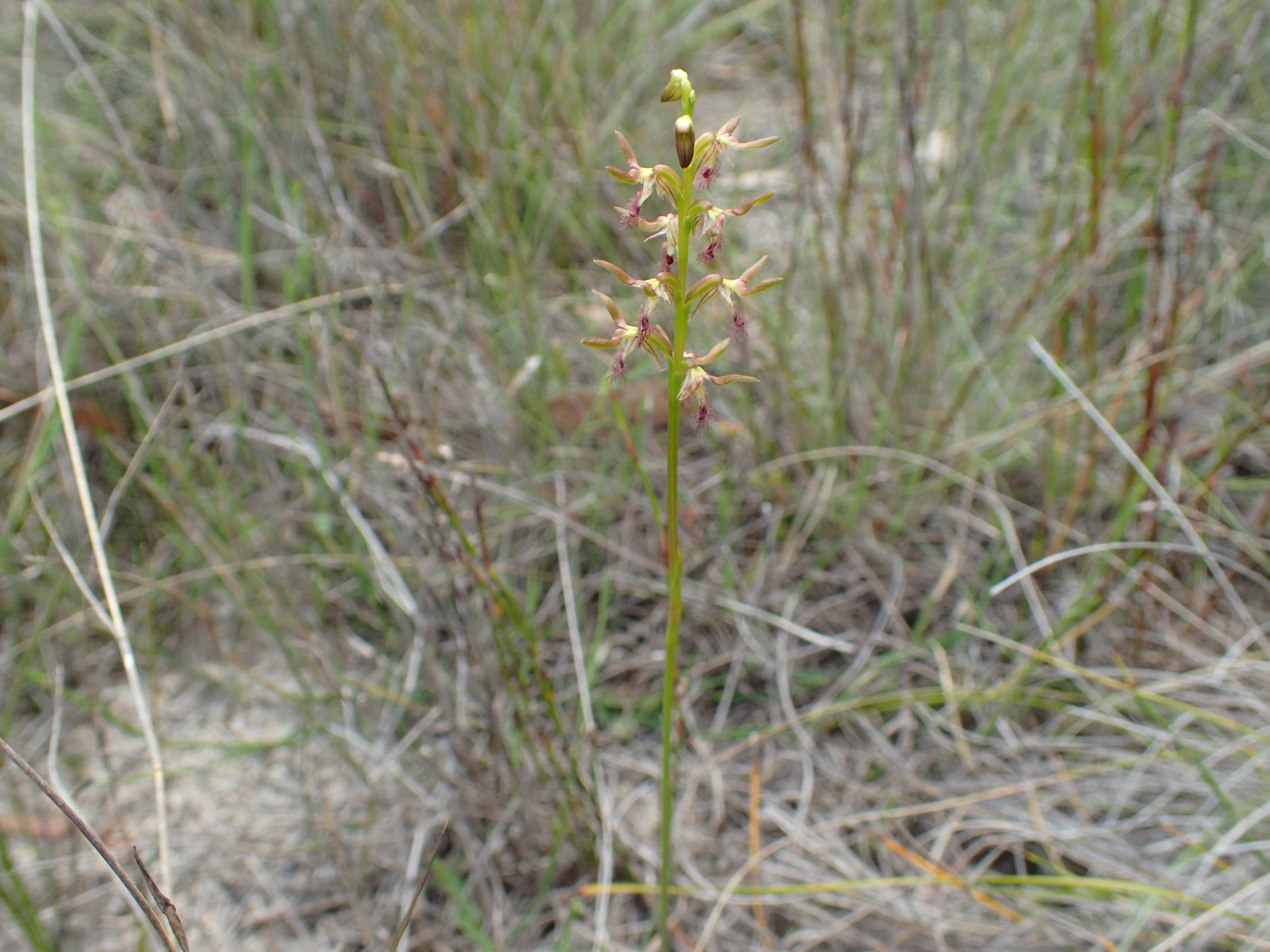
Genoplesium fimbriatum habit

== Description ==
Genoplesium fimbriatum is a terrestrial, perennial, deciduous, herb with an underground tuber and a single thin leaf 200–350 mm (8–10 in) long with the free part 20–30 mm (0.8–1 in) long. Between five and thirty lemon-scented flowers are crowded along a flowering stem 50–100 mm (2–4 in) tall. The flowers are green to brownish-green with red stripes and are 12 mm (0.5 in) long, 9–11 mm (0.35–0.43 in) wide. As with others in the genus, the flowers are inverted so that the labellum is above the column rather than below it. The dorsal sepal is egg-shaped, 4–5 mm (0.16–0.20 in) long, 2–3 mm (0.08–0.1 in) wide with red stripes, a hairy edge and a sharp tip. The lateral sepals are linear to lance-shaped, 5–6 mm (0.20–0.24 in) long, 1–1.5 mm (0.04–0.06 in) wide, free from each other and spread widely apart. The petals are egg-shaped, pointed, about 3 mm (0.1 in) long and 1 mm (0.04 in) wide and striped with long hairs on the edge. The labellum is linear, 4 mm (0.2 in) long, 1 mm (0.04 in) wide with its red tip curled upwards and long pink to red hairs on its edge. The labellum quivers in the slightest breeze. Flowering occurs between December and May.

== Taxonomy and naming ==
The fringed leek orchid was first formally described in 1810 by Robert Brown who gave it the name Prasophyllum fimbriatum and published the description in Prodromus Florae Novae Hollandiae et Insulae Van Diemen. In 1989, David Jones and Mark Clements changed the name to Genoplesium fimbriatum and in 2002 changed the name again to Corunastylis fimbriata but the latter change has not been accepted by the World Checklist of Selected Plant Families. The specific epithet (fimbriatum) is a Latin word meaning "fringed" or "fibrous".

== Distribution and habitat ==
Genoplesium fimbriatum grows in a range of habitats including open forest, heath and moss gardens. It is found in near-coastal areas and nearby tablelands between Stanthorpe and Vincentia. It often occurs in areas with frequent wildfires and a relatively high rainfall.
