= Genoplesium eriochilum =

Mount Wilson midge orchid

Scientific classification
- Kingdom: Plantae
- Clade: Tracheophytes
- Clade: Angiosperms
- Clade: Monocots
- Order: Asparagales
- Family: Orchidaceae
- Subfamily: Orchidoideae
- Tribe: Diurideae
- Genus: Genoplesium
- Species: G. eriochilum

Binomial name
- Genoplesium eriochilum (Fitzg.) D.L.Jones & M.A.Clem.

Synonyms
- Prasophyllum eriochilum Fitzg.; Corunastylis eriochila (Fitzg.) D.L.Jones & M.A.Clem.

Species of orchid

Genoplesium eriochilum, commonly known as the Mount Wilson midge orchid, is a species of small terrestrial orchid endemic to the Blue Mountains. It has a single thin leaf fused to the flowering stem and up to twenty small, crowded, dark purplish brown flowers. It usually grows between low shrubs and sedges.

== Description ==
Genoplesium eriochilum is a terrestrial, perennial, deciduous, herb with an underground tuber and a single thin leaf 100–200 mm (4–8 in) long and fused to the flowering stem with the free part 8–12 mm (0.3–0.5 in) long. Between five and twenty dark purplish brown flowers are crowded along a flowering stem 10–25 mm (0.4–1 in) tall and much taller than the leaf. The flowers are about 4.5 mm (0.18 in) long and 3 mm (0.12 in) wide and lean downwards. As with others in the genus, the flowers are inverted so that the labellum is above the column rather than below it. The sepals, petals and labellum all have tiny hairs on their edges. The dorsal sepal is about 3 mm (0.1 in) long and 1.4 mm (0.06 in) wide with a pointed tip. The lateral sepals are about 3.5 mm (0.1 in) long, 1 mm (0.04 in) wide and spread widely apart from each other. The petals are about 2 mm (0.08 in) long, 1 mm (0.04 in) wide with a sharply pointed tip. The labellum is about 2 mm (0.08 in) long, 1.5 mm (0.06 in) wide, thick and fleshy with a pointed tip. There is a callus in the centre of the labellum and extending nearly to its tip. Flowering occurs from November to January.

== Taxonomy and naming ==
The Mount Wilson midge orchid was first formally described in 1885 by Robert D. FitzGerald who gave it the name Prasophyllum eriochilum and published the description in Journal of Botany, British and Foreign. In 1989, David Jones and Mark Clements changed the name to Genoplesium eriochilum and in 2002, changed it again to Corunastylis eriochila but the last change is not accepted by the Australian Plant Census. The specific epithet (eriochilum) is derived from the Ancient Greek words ἔριον (erion) meaning "wool" and χεῖλος (cheilos) meaning lip.

== Distribution and habitat ==
Genoplesium eriochilum is only known from the Blue Mountains between Blackheath, Mount Wilson and Mount Victoria, where it grows in heath with grasses and sedges.
