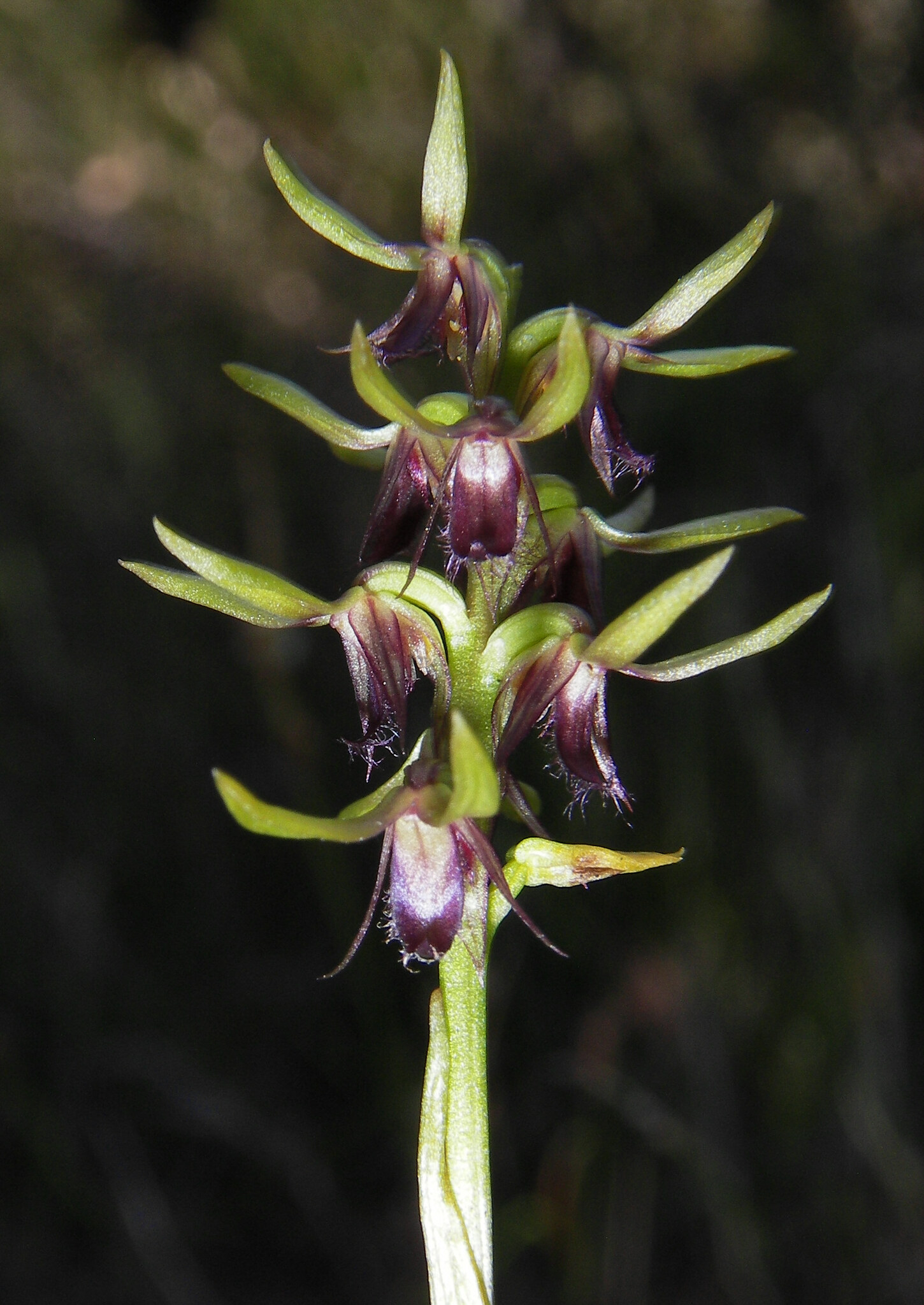
- Photographed in 2004

Scientific classification
- Kingdom: Plantae
- Clade: Tracheophytes
- Clade: Angiosperms
- Clade: Monocots
- Order: Asparagales
- Family: Orchidaceae
- Subfamily: Orchidoideae
- Tribe: Diurideae
- Genus: Genoplesium
- Species: G. carectum

Binomial name
- Genoplesium carectum (D.L.Jones & L.M.Copel.) J.M.H.Shaw

Synonyms
- Corunastylis carecta D.L.Jones & L.M.Copel.

= Genoplesium carectum =

Species of orchid

Genoplesium carectum is a species of small terrestrial orchid endemic to a restricted part of New South Wales. It has a single leaf fused to the flowering stem and between three and thirteen brownish-green flowers with purple and red markings. It occurs in three populations in swampy places in and near Wollemi National Park.

== Description ==
Genoplesium carectum is a terrestrial, perennial, deciduous, herb with an underground tuber and a single leaf 100–180 mm (3.9–7.1 in) long, sheathing the flowering stem with the free part 10–30 mm (0.39–1.18 in) long and about 2 mm (0.079 in) wide. Between three and thirteen brownish-green flowers with purple and red markings are arranged along a flowering stem 20–35 mm (0.79–1.38 in) long. The flowers are 7–8 mm (0.28–0.31 in) long and about 6 mm (0.24 in) wide. As with others in the genus, the flowers are inverted so that the labellum is above the column rather than below it. The dorsal sepal is egg-shaped and forms a hood over the column, 4.0–4.5 millimetres (0.16–0.18 in) long and about 2.2 mm (0.087 in) wide with red markings. The lateral sepals are linear, 5.0–5.5 mm (0.20–0.22 in) long, about 1.2 mm (0.047 in) wide, and lack a humped base. The petals are narrowly egg-shaped, 3.8–4.2 mm (0.15–0.17 in) long, about 1 mm (0.039 in) wide with red edges and a red stripe along the centre. The labellum is narrowly elliptic to elliptic, about 4 mm (0.16 in) long and 1.5 mm (0.059 in) wide with many short, purple hairs. There is a purple callus covering half the base of the labellum and extending nearly to its tip. Flowering is variable, but has been observed between November and February.

== Taxonomy and naming ==
This species of orchid was first formally described in 2013 by David Jones and Lachlan Copeland who gave it the name Corunastylis carecta and published the description in The Orchadian from specimens Copeland collected near the Putty Road in 2006. In 2017, Matthew Renner changed the name to Genoplesium carectum in the Quarterly Supplement to the International Register of Orchid Hybrids (Sander's List). and the name is accepted by Plants of the World Online. The specific epithet (carectum) means "a place covered with rushes or sedges".

== Distribution and habitat ==
Genoplesium carectum grows in swampy habitat with low shrubs and grasses. It is only known from three populations in and near the Wollemi National Park.
