= Genoplesium sigmoideum =

Dave's Creek midge orchid

Scientific classification
- Kingdom: Plantae
- Clade: Embryophytes
- Clade: Tracheophytes
- Clade: Spermatophytes
- Clade: Angiosperms
- Clade: Monocots
- Order: Asparagales
- Family: Orchidaceae
- Subfamily: Orchidoideae
- Tribe: Diurideae
- Genus: Genoplesium
- Species: G. sigmoideum

Binomial name
- Genoplesium sigmoideum D.L.Jones

Synonyms
- Corunastylis sigmoidea (D.L.Jones) D.L.Jones & M.A.Clem.

Species of orchid

Genoplesium sigmoideum, commonly known as the Dave's Creek midge orchid, is a species of small terrestrial orchid that is endemic to a small area in the Lamington National Park in Queensland, Australia. It has a single thin leaf fused to the flowering stem and up to twenty dark red flowers with a hairy labellum. The species is treated as Corunastylis sigmoidea in Queensland.

== Description ==
Genoplesium sigmoideum is a terrestrial, perennial, deciduous, herb with an underground tuber and a single thin leaf with a reddish base and 80–140 mm (3–6 in) long, fused to the flowering stem with the free part 10–15 mm (0.4–0.6 in) long. Between five and twenty flowers are crowded along a flowering stem 20–40 mm (0.8–2 in) long, reaching to a height 100–180 mm (4–7 in). The flowers lean downwards, are dark red and about 3.5 mm (0.1 in) wide. The flowers are inverted so that the labellum is above the column rather than below it. The dorsal sepal is egg-shaped, about 2 mm (0.08 in) long and 1.5 mm (0.06 in) wide and concave. The lateral sepals are linear to lance-shaped, about 4 mm (0.2 in) long, 1 mm (0.04 in) wide and spread widely apart with a whitish gland on the tip. The petals are linear to egg-shaped, about 2 mm (0.08 in) long and 1 mm (0.04 in) wide with a prominent S-shaped gland on the tip. The labellum is elliptic to egg-shaped with the narrower end towards the base, about 2 mm (0.08 in) long, 1.5 mm (0.06 in) wide with its edges densely covered with short hairs. There is a thick, tapering, dark purplish-red callus in the centre of the labellum and extending almost to its tip. Flowering occurs in December and January.

== Taxonomy and naming ==
Genoplesium sigmoideum was first formally described in 1991 by David Jones and the description was published in Australian Orchid Research. In 2002, David Jones and Mark Clements changed the name to Corunastylis sigmoidea, the name the species is known by in Queensland, but the latter name is not accepted by the Australian Plant Census. The specific epithet (sigmoideum) refers to the S-shaped gland on the petals.

== Distribution and habitat ==
Genoplesium sigmoideum grows with low shrubs in shallow soil on rock ledges near Dave's Creek in the Lamington National Park.
