= Genoplesium validum =

Blackdown midge orchid

Scientific classification
- Kingdom: Plantae
- Clade: Tracheophytes
- Clade: Angiosperms
- Clade: Monocots
- Order: Asparagales
- Family: Orchidaceae
- Subfamily: Orchidoideae
- Tribe: Diurideae
- Genus: Genoplesium
- Species: G. validum

Binomial name
- Genoplesium validum D.L.Jones

Synonyms
- Corunastylis valida (D.L.Jones) D.L.Jones & M.A.Clem.

Species of orchid

Genoplesium validum, commonly known as the Blackdown midge orchid, is a species of small terrestrial orchid that is endemic to the Blackdown Tableland National Park in Queensland, Australia. It has a single thin leaf fused to the flowering stem and up to thirty five greenish-brown flowers with reddish stripes and a hairy labellum. This species is treated as Corunastylis valida in Queensland.

== Description ==
Genoplesium validum is a terrestrial, perennial, deciduous herb with an underground tuber. It has a single thin leaf with a reddish base, 200–300 mm (8–10 in) long, fused to the flowering stem with the free part 25–35 mm (0.98–1.4 in) long. Between 15 and 35 flowers are arranged along a flowering stem 50–90 mm (2.0–3.5 in) long, reaching to a height of 250–400 mm (10–20 in). The flowers lean downwards, are greenish-brown, about 6 mm (0.2 in) long and 4 mm (0.2 in) wide. As with others in the genus, the flowers are inverted so that the labellum is above the column rather than below it. The dorsal sepal is elliptic to narrow egg-shaped, about 4.5 mm (0.2 in) long, 2 mm (0.08 in) wide and greenish with narrow, dark purplish bands. The lateral sepals are linear to lance-shaped, about 5 mm (0.2 in) long, 1 mm (0.04 in) wide and spread widely apart from each other. The petals are linear to egg-shaped, about 3.5 mm (0.1 in) long and 1 mm (0.04 in) wide with dark purplish bands. The labellum is elliptic to broadly oblong, about 3 mm (0.1 in) long, 1.5 mm (0.06 in) wide and dark purplish-black with its edges densely covered with short, coarse purplish hairs. There is a dark purplish-black callus in the centre of the labellum, extending almost to its tip. Flowering occurs from December to April.

== Taxonomy and naming ==
Genoplesium validum was first formally described in 1991 by David Jones and the description was published in Australian Orchid Research. In 2002, David Jones and Mark Clements changed the name to Corunastylis valida, a name that is accepted in Queensland but not by the Australian Plant Census. The specific epithet (validum) is a Latin word meaning "strong" or "powerful", referring to the robust habit of this orchid.

== Distribution and habitat ==
The Blackdown midge orchid grows in sandy soil in rocky places on the Blackdown Tableland.
