= Genoplesium pedersonii =

Pederson's midge orchid

Scientific classification
- Kingdom: Plantae
- Clade: Tracheophytes
- Clade: Angiosperms
- Clade: Monocots
- Order: Asparagales
- Family: Orchidaceae
- Subfamily: Orchidoideae
- Tribe: Diurideae
- Genus: Genoplesium
- Species: G. pedersonii

Binomial name
- Genoplesium pedersonii D.L.Jones

Synonyms
- Corunastylis pedersonii (D.L.Jones) D.L.Jones & M.A.Clem.

Species of orchid

Genoplesium pedersonii, commonly known as Pederson's midge orchid, is a species of small terrestrial orchid endemic to the Blackdown Tableland in Queensland. It has a single thin leaf fused to the flowering stem and up to thirty small, greenish red to reddish, self-pollinating flowers with a dark purplish red labellum. The species is treated as Corunastylis pedersonii in Queensland.

== Description ==
Genoplesium pedersonii is a terrestrial, perennial, deciduous, herb with an underground tuber and a single thin leaf 80–160 mm (3–6 in) long and fused to the flowering stem with the free part 12–19 mm (0.5–0.7 in) long. Between five and thirty flowers are well spaced along a flowering stem 100–250 mm (4–10 in) tall and taller than the leaf. The flowers lean downwards and are greenish red to reddish, about 1.5 mm (0.06 in) wide. The flowers are inverted so that the labellum is above the column rather than below it. The dorsal sepal is broadly egg-shaped, about 1.5 mm (0.06 in) long and wide and concave. The lateral sepals are lance-shaped, about 2.5 mm (0.1 in) long and 1 mm (0.04 in) wide and spread widely apart. The petals are egg-shaped, about 1.5 mm (0.06 in) long and 1 mm (0.04 in) wide. The labellum is dark purplish red, egg-shaped with the narrower end towards the base, about 1.5 mm (0.06 in) long, 1 mm (0.04 in) wide and turns upwards near its middle. There is a dark purplish black callus in the centre of the labellum and covering about two-thirds of its surface. Flowering occurs from December to April.

== Taxonomy and naming ==
Genoplesium pedersonii was first formally described in 1991 by David Jones and the description was published in Australian Orchid Research. In 2002, David Jones and Mark Clements changed the name to Corunastylis pedersonii and the species is known by that name in Queensland, but the name is not accepted by the Australian Plant Census. The specific epithet (pedersonii) honours Mr Ted Pederson who discovered this and several other orchid species.

== Distribution and habitat ==
Genoplesium pedersonii grows with sedges and mosses in moist areas on rock ledges on the Blackdown Tableland.

There are unconfirmed records of this species from the Pilliga forest in New South Wales.
