= Genoplesium psammophilum =

Scientific classification
- Kingdom: Plantae
- Clade: Tracheophytes
- Clade: Angiosperms
- Clade: Monocots
- Order: Asparagales
- Family: Orchidaceae
- Subfamily: Orchidoideae
- Tribe: Diurideae
- Genus: Genoplesium
- Species: G. psammophilum

Binomial name
- Genoplesium psammophilum D.L.Jones

Synonyms
- Corunastylis psammophila (D.L.Jones) D.L.Jones & M.A.Clem.

Species of orchid

Genoplesium psammophilum is a species of small terrestrial orchid endemic to coastal and near-coastal areas in south-eastern Queensland. It has a single thin leaf fused to the flowering stem and up to thirty five small, dark red or brownish red flowers. The species is treated as Corunastylis psammophila in Queensland.

== Description ==
Genoplesium psammophilum is a terrestrial, perennial, deciduous, herb with an underground tuber and a single thin leaf 100–250 mm (4–10 in) long and fused to the flowering stem with the free part 14–16 mm (0.55–0.63 in) long. Between five and thirty five flowers are crowded along a flowering stem which is 10–35 mm (0.4–1 in) long, reaching to a height of 120–300 mm (5–10 in). The flowers are dark red or brownish red and about 3 mm (0.1 in) wide. As with others in the genus, the flowers are inverted so that the labellum is above the column rather than below it. The dorsal sepal is linear to egg-shaped, about 2–2.5 mm (0.08–0.1 in) long and 1.5–2 mm (0.06–0.08 in) wide and the lateral sepals are more or less lance-shaped, about 3–3.5 mm (0.12–0.14 in) long, 1 mm (0.04 in) wide and spread widely apart. There is a small, white gland on the tip of the lateral sepals. The petals are linear to egg-shaped, about 2 mm (0.08 in) long and 1 mm (0.04 in) wide with an s-shaped gland on the tip. The labellum is light to dark red, elliptic to egg-shaped with the narrower end towards the base, about 2.5 mm (0.1 in) long and 1 mm (0.04 in) wide. There is a reddish to reddish black callus in the centre of the labellum and covering about half of its surface. Flowering occurs from March to May.

== Taxonomy and naming ==
Genoplesium psammophilum was first formally described in 1991 by David Jones from a specimen collected near Amity and the description was published in Australian Orchid Research. In 2002, David Jones and Mark Clements changed the name to Corunastylis psammophila and the species is known by that name in Queensland, but the name is not accepted by the Australian Plant Census. The specific epithet (psammophila) is derived from the Ancient Greek words ψάμμος (psámmos), meaning “sand” and φίλος (phílos), meaning “dear one" or "friend”, referring to the soil type in which this species is found.

== Distribution and habitat ==
Genoplesium psammophilum grows in coastal and near-coastal heath and wallum in south-eastern Queensland.
