= Genoplesium oliganthum =

Mongarlowe midge orchid

Scientific classification
- Kingdom: Plantae
- Clade: Tracheophytes
- Clade: Angiosperms
- Clade: Monocots
- Order: Asparagales
- Family: Orchidaceae
- Subfamily: Orchidoideae
- Tribe: Diurideae
- Genus: Genoplesium
- Species: G. oliganthum

Binomial name
- Genoplesium oliganthum D.L.Jones

Synonyms
- Corunastylis oligantha (D.L.Jones) D.L.Jones & M.A.Clem.

Species of orchid

Genoplesium oliganthum, commonly known as the Mongarlowe midge orchid, is a species of small terrestrial orchid which is endemic to New South Wales. It has a single thin leaf and up to nine greenish brown to reddish flowers with a purplish labellum. It grows with grasses and shrubs on the Southern Tablelands.

== Description ==
Genoplesium oliganthum is a terrestrial, perennial, deciduous, herb with an underground tuber and a single leaf which is 80–200 mm (3–8 in) long with the free part 10–18 mm (0.4–0.7 in) long. Up to nine greenish brown to reddish flowers are arranged along 10–20 mm (0.4–0.8 in) of the flowering stem which is taller than the leaf. The flowers are about 10 mm (0.4 in) long and 9 mm (0.4 in) wide and have darker stripes on the dorsal sepal and petals. As with others in the genus, the flowers are inverted so that the labellum is above the column rather than below it. The dorsal sepal is about 5.5 mm (0.2 in) long and 3 mm (0.1 in) wide with hairless edges and a sharply pointed tip. The lateral sepals are about 7 mm (0.3 in) long, 2 mm (0.08 in) wide and spread widely apart from each other. The petals are about 5.5 mm (0.2 in) long and 2 mm (0.08 in) wide with hairless edges and a sharply pointed tip. The labellum is elliptic in shape, about 5 mm (0.2 in) long, 3 mm (0.1 in) wide, thick and fleshy with hairy edges and a pointed tip. There is a callus in the centre of the labellum and extending almost to its tip. Flowering occurs between January and April.

== Taxonomy and naming ==
Genoplesium oliganthum was first formally described in 2001 by David Jones who published the description in The Orchadian from a specimen collected near Braidwood. In 2002, Jones and Mark Clements changed the name to Corunastylis oligantha. The specific epithet (oliganthum) is derived from the Ancient Greek words oligos meaning "few, little" or "scanty" and anthos meaning "flower".

== Distribution and habitat ==
The Mongarlowe midge orchid grows with grasses and shrubs in woodland between Mongarlowe, Braidwood and Nerriga.
