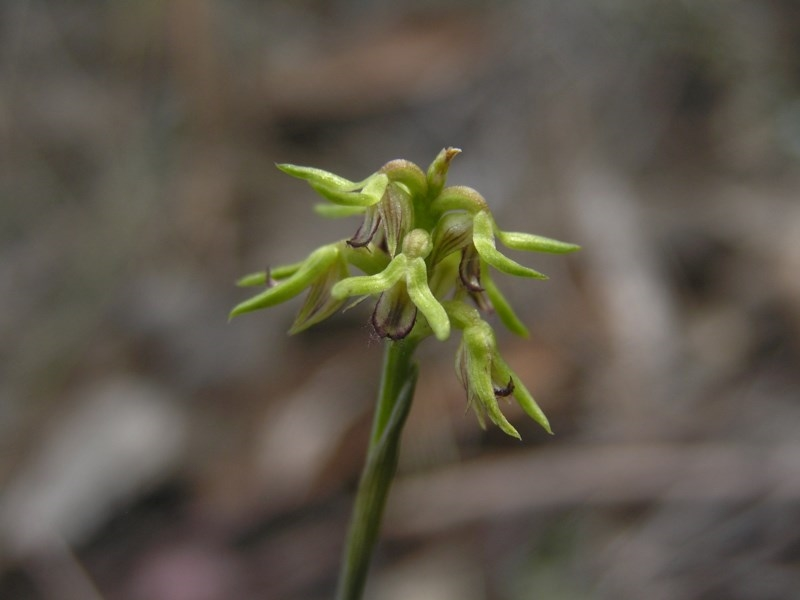
- Near Yass River

Scientific classification
- Kingdom: Plantae
- Clade: Tracheophytes
- Clade: Angiosperms
- Clade: Monocots
- Order: Asparagales
- Family: Orchidaceae
- Subfamily: Orchidoideae
- Tribe: Diurideae
- Genus: Genoplesium
- Species: G. cornutum

Binomial name
- Genoplesium cornutum (D.L.Jones) J.M.H.Shaw

Synonyms
- Corunastylis cornuta D.L.Jones

= Genoplesium cornutum =

Species of orchid

Genoplesium cornutum, commonly known as horned midge orchid, is a species of small terrestrial orchid that is endemic to eastern Australia. It has a single leaf fused to the flowering stem and between two and ten crowded, green and reddish-purple flowers.

== Description ==
Genoplesium cornutum is a terrestrial, perennial, deciduous, herb with an underground tuber and a single cylindrical leaf sheathing the flowering stem. Between two and ten crowded, green flowers with a reddish-purple labellum are arranged along a flowering stem up to 180 mm (7.1 in) high. As with others in the genus, the flowers are inverted so that the labellum is above the column rather than below it. The lateral sepals are held horizontally to slightly elevated and spread apart. The labellum is reddish-purple and elliptical with an upturned tip, and has a few short hairs on the edges. Flowering occurs from February to April.

== Taxonomy ==
This species was first formally described in 2008 by David Jones who gave it the name Corunastylis cornuta in The Orchadian, from a specimen collected from the Black Mountain Reserve. In 2014 Julian Shaw changed the name to Genoplesium cornutum. The specific epithet (cornutum) is a Latin word meaning "horned".

== Distribution and habitat ==
Genoplesium cornutum grows in woodland and drier forests, often hidden in grass tussocks. It occurs in the ranges of the Australian Capital Territory and north to near Goulburn in New South Wales.
