= Genoplesium confertum =

Crowded midge orchid

Scientific classification
- Kingdom: Plantae
- Clade: Tracheophytes
- Clade: Angiosperms
- Clade: Monocots
- Order: Asparagales
- Family: Orchidaceae
- Subfamily: Orchidoideae
- Tribe: Diurideae
- Genus: Genoplesium
- Species: G. confertum

Binomial name
- Genoplesium confertum D.L.Jones

Synonyms
- Corunastylis conferta (D.L.Jones) D.L.Jones & M.A.Clem.

Species of orchid

Genoplesium confertum, commonly known as the crowded midge orchid, is a small terrestrial orchid endemic to the south-east of Queensland. It has a single thin leaf fused to the flowering stem and up to sixty small, densely crowded, reddish and green flowers and grows in coastal heath.

== Description ==
Genoplesium confertum is a terrestrial, perennial, deciduous, herb with an underground tuber and a single thin leaf 100–160 mm (4–6 in) long, about 1 mm (0.04 in) wide and fused to the flowering stem with the free part 11–13 mm (0.4–0.5 in) long. Between ten and sixty flowers are densely crowded along a flowering stem 15–35 mm (0.6–1 in) tall and slightly taller than the leaf. The flowers lean forwards, are reddish with green tips, 3.5 mm (0.14 in) long and about 3 mm (0.1 in) wide. The flowers are inverted so that the labellum is above the column rather than below it. The dorsal sepal is pinkish red, broadly egg-shaped, about 3 mm (0.1 in) long and 2 mm (0.08 in) wide. The lateral sepals are linear to lance-shaped, 4 mm (0.2 in) long, 1.5 mm (0.06 in) wide, spread apart from each other and have a small whitish gland on their tip. The petals are lance-shaped to egg-shaped, blackish red, about 2 mm (0.08 in) long and 11 mm (0.4 in) wide with a prominent gland on their tips. The labellum is dark red, egg-shaped with the narrower end towards the base, about 2 mm (0.08 in) long, 1 mm (0.04 in) wide, with small teeth on the sides. There is a thick, fleshy callus in the centre of the labellum, covering about half of its surface and extending almost to its tip. Flowering occurs between February and May.

== Taxonomy and naming ==
Genoplesium confertum was first formally described in 1991 by David Jones from a specimen collected near the road to Rainbow Beach in the Great Sandy National Park and the description was published in Australian Orchid Research. In 2002, David Jones and Mark Clements changed the name to Corunastylis conferta but the change is not accepted by the Australian Plant Census. The specific epithet (conferta) is a Latin word meaning "crowded", referring to the crowded flowers in this species.

== Distribution and habitat ==
Genoplesium confertum grows in heath on stabilised sand dunes in coastal districts between Fraser Island and Runaway Bay, including the Great Sandy National Park.
