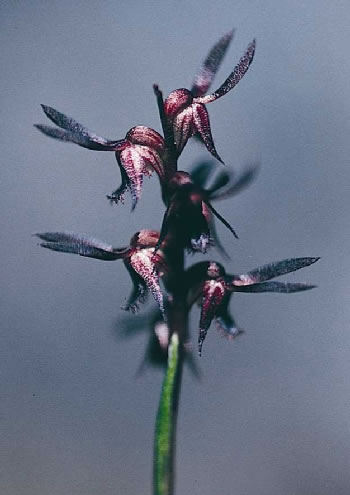

Conservation status
- Endangered (EPBC Act)

Scientific classification
- Kingdom: Plantae
- Clade: Tracheophytes
- Clade: Angiosperms
- Clade: Monocots
- Order: Asparagales
- Family: Orchidaceae
- Subfamily: Orchidoideae
- Tribe: Diurideae
- Genus: Genoplesium
- Species: G. rhyoliticum

Binomial name
- Genoplesium rhyoliticum D.L.Jones & M.A.Clem.

= Genoplesium rhyoliticum =

Pambula midge orchid

Species of orchid

Genoplesium rhyoliticum, commonly known as the Pambula midge-orchid or rhyolite midge orchid and as Corunastylis rhyolitica in Australia, is a species of orchid endemic to New South Wales. It is a small orchid with up to eighteen dark, purplish-black flowers and is only known from six sites on the south coast where it grows in shallow soil over rhyolite.

== Description ==
Genoplesium rhyoliticum is a terrestrial, perennial, deciduous, herb with an underground tuber and a single thin leaf 100–150 mm (4–6 in) long and fused to the flowering stem with the free part 10–15 mm (0.4–0.6 in) long. Between five and eighteen dark purplish-black flowers are crowded along a flowering stem 20–30 mm (0.8–1 in) long and taller than the leaf. The flowers are about 5 mm (0.2 in) long and 4 mm (0.16 in) wide and as with others in the genus, are inverted so that the labellum is above the column rather than below it. The dorsal sepal is narrow egg-shaped, about 4.5 mm (0.2 in) long and 2 mm (0.08 in) wide, with dark bands and hairless edges. The lateral sepals are linear to lance-shaped, about 5 mm (0.2 in) long, 1 mm (0.04 in) wide, and nearly parallel to each other. The petals are narrow egg-shaped, about 4 mm (0.2 in) long and 1 mm (0.04 in) wide with a pointed tip and sometimes a few hairs on the edges. The labellum is egg-shaped with the narrower end towards the base, 3.5 mm (0.1 in) long and 1.5 mm (0.06 in) wide with coarse hairs along its edges. There is a narrow triangular callus in the centre of the labellum and extending almost to its tip. Flowering occurs in December and January.

== Taxonomy and naming ==
Genoplesium rhyoliticum was first described in 1991 by David Jones and Mark Clements from a specimen collected near Pambula and the description was published in Australian orchid Research. In 2002 Jones and Clements changed the name to Corunastylis rhyolitica. The specific epithet (rhyoliticum) refers to the rock type on which this orchid grows.

== Distribution and habitat ==
The Pambula midge-orchid usually grows in very shallow soil over rhyolite without shrubs or trees, but sometimes under shrubs in heath. It only occurs in six sites near Pambula.

== Conservation ==
Of the six populations of G. rhyoliticum, three occur in the South East Forests National Park and the only known threat to the species is grazing by native mammals. The species is listed as "Endangered" under the New South Wales Threatened Species Conservation Act and the Commonwealth Government Environment Protection and Biodiversity Conservation Act 1999 (EPBC) Act.
