= Genoplesium anthracinum =

Black midge orchid

Scientific classification
- Kingdom: Plantae
- Clade: Tracheophytes
- Clade: Angiosperms
- Clade: Monocots
- Order: Asparagales
- Family: Orchidaceae
- Subfamily: Orchidoideae
- Tribe: Diurideae
- Genus: Genoplesium
- Species: G. anthracinum

Binomial name
- Genoplesium anthracinum (D.L.Jones) J.M.H.Shaw

Synonyms
- Corunastylis anthracina D.L.Jones

Species of orchid

Genoplesium anthracinum, commonly known as the black midge orchid, is a species of small terrestrial orchid endemic to New South Wales. It has a single thin leaf fused to the flowering stem and up to thirty small, coal black flowers. It grows in heath in coastal and near-coastal parts of the Northern Rivers area.

== Description ==
Genoplesium anthracinum is a terrestrial, perennial, deciduous, herb with an underground tuber and a single thin leaf 100–200 mm (4–8 in) long and fused to the flowering stem with the free part 15–28 mm (0.6–1 in) long. Between eight and thirty coal black flowers are arranged along a flowering stem 15–40 mm (0.6–2 in) tall and taller than the leaf. The flowers are about 4 mm (0.2 in) long and 5 mm (0.2 in) wide and are inverted so that the labellum is above the column rather than below it. The dorsal sepal is about 4 mm (0.16 in) long and 3.5 mm (0.1 in) wide with hairless edges. The lateral sepals are about 6 mm (0.2 in) long, 1.5 mm (0.06 in) wide, have a prominent gland on the pointed tip and spread widely apart from each other. The petals are about 2.5 mm (0.1 in) long, 1 mm (0.04 in) wide with hairless edges and spread widely apart from each other. The labellum is about 2.5 mm (0.1 in) long, 1 mm (0.04 in) wide, with an irregular margin and a sharply pointed tip. There is a callus in the centre of the labellum and extending nearly to its tip. Flowering occurs in April and May.

== Taxonomy and naming ==
The black midge orchid was first formally described in 2006 by David Jones who gave it the name Corunastylis anthracina and published the description in Australian Orchid Research. In 2014, Julian Shaw changed the name to Genoplesium anthracinum. The specific epithet (anthracinum) means "coal black".

== Distribution and habitat ==
Genoplesium anthracinum grows in heath, often colonising disturbed sites and is found between Byron Bay and Wardell.
