= Genoplesium cranei =

Blackall Range midge orchid

Scientific classification
- Kingdom: Plantae
- Clade: Tracheophytes
- Clade: Angiosperms
- Clade: Monocots
- Order: Asparagales
- Family: Orchidaceae
- Subfamily: Orchidoideae
- Tribe: Diurideae
- Genus: Genoplesium
- Species: G. cranei

Binomial name
- Genoplesium cranei D.L.Jones

Synonyms
- Corunastylis cranei (D.L.Jones) D.L.Jones & M.A.Clem.

Species of orchid

Genoplesium cranei, commonly known as the Blackall Range midge orchid, is a small terrestrial orchid endemic to the Blackall Range in Queensland. It has a single thin leaf fused to the flowering stem and up to twenty small, green to greenish yellow flowers with reddish markings. It grows in open forest with shrubs and grasses.

== Description ==
Genoplesium cranei is a terrestrial, perennial, deciduous, herb with an underground tuber and a single thin leaf 180–300 mm (7–10 in) long and fused to the flowering stem with the free part 14–20 mm (0.6–0.8 in) long. Between five and twenty flowers are well spaced along a flowering stem 30–60 mm (1–2 in) tall and much taller than the leaf. The flowers project forwards away from the flowering stem. They are green to greenish yellow with reddish markings, 4–4.5 mm (0.16–0.18 in) long and remain closed or barely open. The flowers are inverted so that the labellum is above the column rather than below it. The dorsal sepal is about 3.5 mm (0.1 in) long and 2.5 mm (0.1 in) wide with a sharply pointed tip and hairless margins. The lateral sepals are 5 mm (0.2 in) long and 2 mm (0.08 in) wide with a humped base. The petals are about 2.5 mm (0.1 in) long and 1 mm (0.04 in) wide with hairless edges and a small white gland on their tips. The labellum is dark red, egg-shaped with the narrower end towards the base, about 3 mm (0.1 in) long, 1.5 mm (0.06 in) wide and turns sharply upwards near its middle. There is a small callus in the centre of the labellum. Flowering occurs in February and March.

== Taxonomy and naming ==
Genoplesium cranei was first formally described in 2000 by David Jones from a specimen collected in the Mapleton State Forest in the Blackall and the description was published in The Orchadian. In 2002, David Jones and Mark Clements changed the name to Corunastylis cranei but the change is not accepted by the Australian Plant Census. The specific epithet (cranei) honours the collector of the type specimen.

== Distribution and habitat ==
Genoplesium cranei grows with shrubs and grasses in shallow, stony soil in open forest in the Blackall Range.
