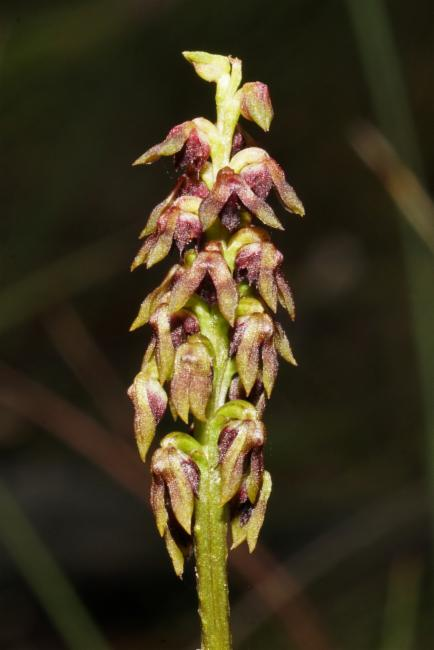
- Genoplesium ruppii near Wangi Wangi

Scientific classification
- Kingdom: Plantae
- Clade: Tracheophytes
- Clade: Angiosperms
- Clade: Monocots
- Order: Asparagales
- Family: Orchidaceae
- Subfamily: Orchidoideae
- Tribe: Diurideae
- Genus: Genoplesium
- Species: G. ruppii

Binomial name
- Genoplesium ruppii (R.S.Rogers) D.L.Jones & M.A.Clem.

Synonyms
- Corunastylis ruppii (R.S.Rogers) D.L.Jones & M.A.Clem.; Prasophyllum ruppii R.S.Rogers; Prasophyllum ruppii R.S.Rogers var. ruppii

= Genoplesium ruppii =

Rupp's midge orchid

Species of orchid

Genoplesium ruppii, commonly known as Rupp's midge orchid, is a species of small terrestrial orchid that is endemic to eastern Australia. It has a single thin leaf fused to the flowering stem and up to twenty five small, hairy green flowers with a purple labellum.

== Description ==
Genoplesium ruppii is a terrestrial, perennial, deciduous, herb with an underground tuber and a single thin leaf 100–180 mm (4–7 in) long and fused to the flowering stem with the free part 8–15 mm (0.3–0.6 in) long. Between twelve and twenty five greenish flowers are crowded along a flowering stem 15–30 mm (0.6–1 in) long and much taller than the leaf. The flowers are about 5 mm (0.2 in) long and 4 mm (0.2 in) wide and are inverted so that the labellum is above the column rather than below it. The dorsal sepal is about 3 mm (0.12 in) long, 2.5 mm (0.1 in) wide and pointed with short glandular hairs on its edges. The lateral sepals are about 5 mm (0.2 in) long, 1 mm (0.04 in) wide and spread apart from each other. The petals are about 2.5 mm (0.1 in) long, 1 mm (0.04 in) wide and sharply pointed with short coarse hairs on their edges. The labellum is dark purple, broadly egg-shaped, thick and fleshy, about 2.5 mm (0.1 in) long, 1.5 mm (0.06 in) wide, with short glandular hairs on its edges. There is a small callus in the centre of the labellum and extending about halfway to its tip. Flowering occurs between January and April.

== Taxonomy and naming ==
Rupp's midge orchid was first formally described in 1927 by Richard Sanders Rogers who gave it the name Prasophyllum ruppii. The type specimen was collected near Paterson by Herman Rupp and the description was published in Transactions and Proceedings of the Royal Society of South Australia. In 2001, David Jones changed the name to Genoplesium ruppii and in 2002 Jones and Mark Clements changed the name again to Corunastylis ruppii, but the latter name change is not accepted by the Australian Plant Census.

== Distribution and habitat ==
Genoplesium ruppii grows in swampy and grassy sites and in heathy forest.
