= Genoplesium leptochilum =

Scientific classification
- Kingdom: Plantae
- Clade: Tracheophytes
- Clade: Angiosperms
- Clade: Monocots
- Order: Asparagales
- Family: Orchidaceae
- Subfamily: Orchidoideae
- Tribe: Diurideae
- Genus: Genoplesium
- Species: G. leptochilum

Binomial name
- Genoplesium leptochilum (D.L.Jones) J.M.H.Shaw

Synonyms
- Corunastylis leptochila D.L.Jones

Species of orchid

Genoplesium leptochilum is a small terrestrial orchid endemic to Victoria. It has a single thin leaf fused to the flowering stem and up to twenty small reddish-brown to dark purplish flowers. It is known from one population with only six plants in forest near a swamp.

== Description ==
Genoplesium leptochilum is a terrestrial, perennial, deciduous, herb with an underground tuber and a single thin leaf 100–150 mm (4–6 in) long. Between five and twenty reddish-brown to dark purplish flowers are densely crowded along a flowering stem 8–15 mm (0.3–0.6 in) tall. The flowers lean downward and are 4–5 mm (0.16–0.20 in) wide. The flowers and are inverted so that the labellum is above the column rather than below it. The dorsal sepal is egg-shaped, 2.0–2.5 mm (0.08–0.1 in) long and about 1.5 mm (0.06 in) wide. The lateral sepals are linear to lance-shaped, 3.5–4.5 mm (0.1–0.2 in) long, 1 mm (0.04 in) wide with a small white gland on the tip. The petals are egg-shaped, about 2.5 mm (0.1 in) long and 1 mm (0.04 in) wide and also have a small gland on the tip. The labellum is narrow elliptic to narrow oblong, about 2 mm (0.08 in) long and 1 mm (0.04 in) wide. There is an oblong callus in the centre of the labellum and extending nearly to its tip. Flowering occurs in November and December.

== Taxonomy and naming ==
This species was first formally described in 2017 by David Jones who gave it the name Corunastylis leptochila in Australian Orchid Review from a specimen collected near Lavers Hill in 1992. In 2019, Julian Shaw changed the name to Genoplesium leptochilum, and the name is accepted by Plants of the World Online. The specific epithet (leptochila) means "slender lip".

== Distribution and habitat ==
Genoplesium leptochilum grows in forest near a swamp near Lavers Hill where only six plants are known.

== Conservation status ==
Corunastylis leptochila is listed as "critically endangered" under the Victorian Government Flora and Fauna Guarantee Act 1988.
