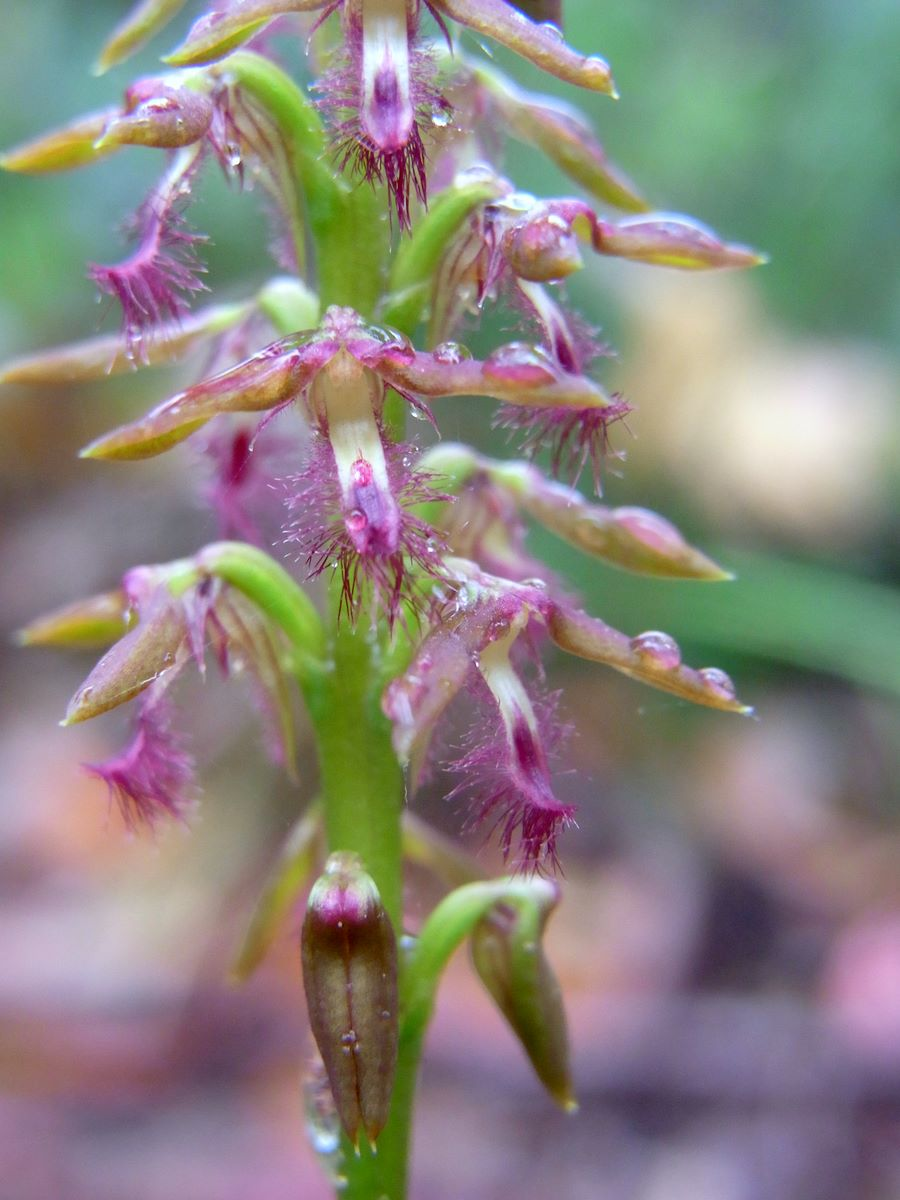
- G. fimbriatum in Ku-ring-gai Chase National Park

Scientific classification
- Kingdom: Plantae
- Clade: Tracheophytes
- Clade: Angiosperms
- Clade: Monocots
- Order: Asparagales
- Family: Orchidaceae
- Subfamily: Orchidoideae
- Tribe: Diurideae
- Subtribe: Prasophyllinae
- Genus: Genoplesium; R.Br.

Synonyms
- Anticheirostylis Fitzg.; Corunastylis Fitzg.

= Genoplesium =

Genus of orchids

Genoplesium commonly known as midge orchids, is a genus of about 50 species of flowering plants in the orchid family, Orchidaceae and is found in Australia, New Zealand and New Caledonia. Midge orchids are terrestrial herbs with a single leaf at the base of the plant. They are similar to orchids in the genus Prasophyllum in that plants without flowers have a hollow, onion-like leaf. The flowers are small but often scented and attractive to their insect pollinators. There is disagreement about which species belong to this genus and some taxonomists suggest that most belong in the genus Corunastylis.

== Description ==
Orchids in the genus Genoplesium are terrestrial, perennial, deciduous, sympodial herbs, usually with a few inconspicuous, fine roots and a pair of more or less spherical tubers. The tubers are partly covered by a protective fibrous sheath which extends to the soil surface. Replacement tubers form at the end of short root-like stolons. Orchids in this genus do not reproduce using "daughter" tubers, but rely on their flowers for reproduction. A single long, cylindrical, glabrous leaf develops near the base of the plant and is fused to the flowering stem. The leaf of flowering plants is solid but those of sterile plants are hollow.

The inflorescence is a spike or raceme with a few to many non-resupinate flowers which are often have reddish brown or purple parts and often smell fruity. The dorsal sepal is usually shorter and wider than two lateral sepals, dished on the lower surface and often forms a hood over the column. The lateral sepals are often joined near their bases and the lateral petals are shorter and narrower than the sepals. As is usual in orchids, one petal is highly modified as the central labellum, much different from the other petals and sepals. The labellum is above the column and joined to it by a flexible attachment, so that the labellum vibrates in a breeze. The edge of the labellum sometimes has fine teeth, glands or hairs. The labellum has a callus which consists often covers its surface and which consists of a raised, fleshy plate. The sexual parts of the flower are fused to the column which is short and has narrow wings, often with an extension at the front. Midge orchids usually flower in summer, autumn or winter, depending on species, and the fruit that follows flowering is a non-fleshy, dehiscent capsule containing up to 500 seeds.

== Taxonomy and naming ==
The genus Genoplesium was first formally described by Robert Brown in 1810 and the description was published in Prodromus Florae Novae Hollandiae. The type species is G. baueri.

The name Genoplesium is derived from the Ancient Greek words genos meaning "race", "stock" or "kind" and plesios meaning "near" referring to the similarity of these orchids to those in the genus Prasophyllum.

David Jones and Mark Clements proposed moving all but one species of Genoplesium to Corunastylis. The change has been accepted by the Royal Botanic Gardens Victoria who list twelve species of Corunastylis but not Plants of the World Online.

== Distribution and habitat ==
Midge orchids mainly occur in Queensland, New South Wales, Victoria, Tasmania and South Australia. There is one species (G. calopterum) in New Caledonia and two (G. nudum and G. pumilum) in New Zealand. Most Genoplesium species occur in near-coastal regions but also grow in montane and sub-alpine areas. In Australia they are most common in moss beds over rock, in forest, woodland, heath and mallee. Genoplesium species in New Zealand grow in grassy places as well as in swamps and the New Caledonian species grows in stunted maquis.

== Ecology ==
Some of the characteristics of the flowers of midge orchids, such as small size, dull colours and hairy parts waving in a breeze, suggest pollination by small flies. Some studies have suggested that the flowers are pollinated exclusively by flies of the Superfamily Chloropoidea (now in the Family Milichiidae). A few species, such as the New Zealand G. nudum appear to exclusively self-pollinate.

== Species list ==
The species recognised by the Plants of the World Online as of July 2023 are:

- Genoplesium acuminatum (R.S.Rogers) D.L.Jones & M.A.Clem. (NSW) – pointed midge orchid
- Genoplesium alticola D.L.Jones & B.Gray (Qld) – tableland midge orchid
- Genoplesium anthracinum (D.L.Jones) J.M.H. Shaw (NSW) – black midge orchid
- Genoplesium apostasioides (Fitzg.) D.L.Jones & M.A.Clem. (NSW) – freak midge orchid
- Genoplesium archeri (Hook.f.) D.L.Jones & M.A.Clem. (Vic, Tas, NSW, Qld) - elfin midge orchid
- Genoplesium arrectum D.L.Jones (Vic, NSW, ACT) – erect midge orchid
- Genoplesium baueri R.Br. (NSW) – brittle midge orchid, yellow gnat orchid
- Genoplesium bishopii D.L.Jones (NSW) – Gibraltar Range midge orchid
- Genoplesium brachystachyum (Lindl.) D.L.Jones & M.A.Clem. (Tas) – short spike midge orchid
- Genoplesium branwhiteorum M.A.M.Renner & P.H.Weston (N.S.W.)
- Genoplesium calopterum (Rchb.f.) D.L.Jones & M.A.Clem. (New Caledonia)
- Genoplesium capparinum (D.L.Jones & L.M.Copel.) J.M.H.Shaw (Vic.)
- Genoplesium carectum (D.L.Jones & J.M.H.Shaw. (N.S.W.)
- Genoplesium citriodorum D.L.Jones & M.A.Clem. (NSW) – lemon-scented midge orchid
- Genoplesium clivicola (D.L.Jones) J.M.H.Shaw (NSW, ACT)
- Genoplesium confertum (D.L.Jones) D.L.Jones & M.A.Clem. (Qld) – crowded midge orchid
- Genoplesium cornutum (D.L.Jones) J.M.H.Shaw (NSW, ACT)
- Genoplesium cranei D.L.Jones (Qld) – Blackall Ridge midge orchid
- Genoplesium cuspidatum (D.L.Jones & L.M.Copel.) J.M.H.Shaw (N.S.W., Qld.)
- Genoplesium despectans (Hook.f.) D.L.Jones & M.A.Clem. (SA, Vic, Tas, NSW) – sharp midge orchid
- Genoplesium ectopum D.L.Jones (ACT) – Brindabella midge orchid
- Genoplesium eriochilum (Fitzg.) D.L.Jones & M.A.Clem. (NSW) – Mount Wilson midge orchid
- Genoplesium filiforme (Fitzg.) D.L.Jones & M.A.Clem. (NSW, Qld) – glandular midge orchid
- Genoplesium fimbriatum (R.Br.) D.L.Jones & M.A.Clem. (NSW, Qld) – fringed midge orchid
- Genoplesium firthii (L.Cady) D.L.Jones (Tas) – Firth's midge orchid
- Genoplesium formosum D.L.Jones (NSW) – Cathcart midge orchid
- Genoplesium geminatum M.A.M.Renner & Towle (NSW)
- Genoplesium insigne D.L.Jones (NSW) – dark midge orchid
- Genoplesium laminatum (Fitzg.) M.A.M.Renner (NSW)
- Genoplesium leptochilum (D.L.Jones) J.M.H.Shaw (Vic)
- Genoplesium littorale D.L.Jones (NSW) – Tuncurry midge orchid
- Genoplesium morinum D.L.Jones (Vic, NSW) – mulberry midge orchid
- Genoplesium morrisii (Nicholls) D.L.Jones & M.A.Clem. (SA, Vic, Tas, NSW) – bearded midge-orchid
- Genoplesium mucronatum (Rupp) M.A.M.Renner (NSW)
- Genoplesium nigricans (R.Br.) D.L.Jones & M.A.Clem. (SA) – mallee midge-orchid
- Genoplesium nudiscapum (Hook.f.) D.L.Jones & M.A.Clem. (Tas) – dense midge-orchid
- Genoplesium nudum (Hook.f.) D.L.Jones & M.A.Clem. (NZ, Vic, Tas, NSW, ACT) – tiny midge orchid
- Genoplesium oliganthum D.L.Jones (NSW) – Mongarlowe midge orchid
- Genoplesium ostrinum D.L.Jones (NSW) – purple midge orchid
- Genoplesium parvicallum (Rupp) D.L.Jones & M.A.Clem. (Qld) – mountain-top midge orchid
- Genoplesium pedersonii D.L.Jones (Qld) – Pederson's midge orchid
- Genoplesium plumosum (Rupp) D.L.Jones & M.A.Clem. (NSW) – Tallong midge orchid or plumed midge orchid
- Genoplesium psammophilum D.L.Jones (Qld) – coastal midge orchid
- Genoplesium pumilum (Hook.f.) D.L.Jones & M.A.Clem. (NZ, Vic, Tas, NSW, Qld) – green midge orchid
- Genoplesium rhyoliticum D.L.Jones & M.A.Clem. (NSW) – Pambula midge orchid
- Genoplesium rufum (R.Br.) D.L.Jones & M.A.Clem. (NSW, Qld) – rufous midge orchid
- Genoplesium ruppii (R.S.Rogers) D.L.Jones & M.A.Clem. (NSW) – Rupp's midge orchid
- Genoplesium sagittiferum (Rupp) D.L.Jones & M.A.Clem. (NSW) – horned midge orchid
- Genoplesium sigmoideum D.L.Jones (Qld) – Dave's Creek midge orchid
- Genoplesium simulans D.L.Jones (NSW) – Blue Mountains midge orchid
- Genoplesium stephensonii (D.L.Jones) J.M.H.Shaw (NSW)
- Genoplesium superbum D.L.Jones (NSW) – pink midge orchid
- Genoplesium systenum D.L.Jones (NSW) – Kangarooby midge orchid
- Genoplesium tasmanicum D.L.Jones (Tas) – Tasmanian midge orchid
- Genoplesium tectum D.L.Jones (Qld) – Cardwell midge orchid
- Genoplesium tenellum (D.L.Jones & L.M.Copel.) J.M.H.Shaw (NSW)
- Genoplesium trifidum (Rupp} M.A.M.Renner (NSW)
- Genoplesium turfosum D.L.Jones (NSW) – alpine midge orchid
- Genoplesium validum D.L.Jones (Qld) – Blackdown midge orchid
- Genoplesium vernale D.L.Jones (NSW) – spring midge orchid
- Genoplesium woollsii (F.Muell.) D.L.Jones & M.A.Clem. (NSW) – dark midge orchid

== See also ==
- List of Orchidaceae genera
