= Genoplesium calopterum =

Scientific classification
- Kingdom: Plantae
- Clade: Tracheophytes
- Clade: Angiosperms
- Clade: Monocots
- Order: Asparagales
- Family: Orchidaceae
- Subfamily: Orchidoideae
- Tribe: Diurideae
- Genus: Genoplesium
- Species: G. calopterum

Binomial name
- Genoplesium calopterum (Rchb.f.) D.L.Jones & M.A.Clem.

Synonyms
- Prasophyllum calopterum Rchb.f.; Bulbophyllum fissipetalum Kraenzl.

Species of orchid

Genoplesium calopterum is a small terrestrial orchid endemic to New Caledonia. It was first formally described in 1876 by Heinrich Gustav Reichenbach who gave it the name Prasophyllum calopterum and published the description in the journal Linnaea - Ein Journal für die Botanik in ihrem ganzen Umfange. In 1989 David Jones and Mark Clements changed the name to Genoplesium calopterum. It grows on the island of Grande Terre.
