= Genoplesium stephensonii =

Scientific classification
- Kingdom: Plantae
- Clade: Tracheophytes
- Clade: Angiosperms
- Clade: Monocots
- Order: Asparagales
- Family: Orchidaceae
- Subfamily: Orchidoideae
- Tribe: Diurideae
- Genus: Genoplesium
- Species: G. stephensonii

Binomial name
- Genoplesium stephensonii (D.L.Jones) J.M.H.Shaw

Synonyms
- Corunastylis stephensonii D.L.Jones

Species of orchid

Genoplesium stephensonii, commonly known as Stephenson's midge orchid, is a species of small terrestrial orchid that is endemic to the south-east of New South Wales. It has a single leaf fused to the flowering stem and usually up to five green flowers with pink to reddish markings.

== Description ==
Genoplesium stephensonii is a terrestrial, perennial, deciduous, herb with an underground tuber and a single cylindrical leaf 100–180 mm (3.9–7.1 in) long, sheathing the flowering stem with the free part 10–15 mm (0.39–0.59 in) long and about 2 mm (0.079 in) wide. Usually up to five, sometimes up to eight green flowers with pink to reddish markings are arranged along a flowering stem 110–200 mm (4.3–7.9 in) long. The flowers are 7–8 mm (0.28–0.31 in) long and about 5.5 mm (0.22 in) wide. As with others in the genus, the flowers are inverted so that the labellum is above the column rather than below it. The dorsal sepal is broadly egg-shaped and forms a hood over the column, 4.5–5.0 mm (0.18–0.20 in) long and about 3.5 mm (0.14 in) wide with red markings. The lateral sepals are linear, 5.0–5.5 mm (0.20–0.22 in) long, about 1.5 mm (0.059 in) wide, and spread apart but lack a humped base. The petals are egg-shaped, 4.3–4.6 mm (0.17–0.18 in) long and about 1.5 mm (0.059 in) wide with red edges and three red stripes along the centre. The labellum is egg-shaped, about 4.3 mm (0.17 in) long and 2.6 mm (0.10 in) wide with many short, pink to purplish hairs. There is a fleshy, dark red callus covering most of the labellum and extending nearly to its tip. Flowering usually occurs between November and February, but also depends on rainfall.

== Taxonomy and naming ==
This species of orchid was first formally described in 2013 by David Jones who gave it the name Corunastylis stephensonii in Australian Orchid Review from specimens he collected near Nowra in 2001. In 2016, Julian Shaw changed the name to Genoplesium stephensonii in the Quarterly Supplement to the International Register of Orchid Hybrids (Sander's List) and the name is accepted by Plants of the World Online. The specific epithet (stephensonii) honours the orchid enthusiast and conservationist, Alan W. Stephenson.

== Distribution and habitat ==
Genoplesium stephensonii grows in shallow, well-drained soil over sandstone rock, and in sandy loam in heathy forest. It is only known from near Nowra and Jervis Bay.
