= Genoplesium ostrinum =

Purple midge orchid

Scientific classification
- Kingdom: Plantae
- Clade: Tracheophytes
- Clade: Angiosperms
- Clade: Monocots
- Order: Asparagales
- Family: Orchidaceae
- Subfamily: Orchidoideae
- Tribe: Diurideae
- Genus: Genoplesium
- Species: G. ostrinum

Binomial name
- Genoplesium ostrinum D.L.Jones

Synonyms
- Corunastylis ostrina (D.L.Jones) D.L.Jones & & M.A.Clem.

Species of orchid

Genoplesium ostrinum, commonly known as the purple midge orchid, is a species of small terrestrial orchid that is endemic to New South Wales. It has a single thin leaf and up to ten dark purple flowers with darker stripes and a hairy labellum which vibrates in the slightest breeze.

== Description ==
Genoplesium fimbriatum is a terrestrial, perennial, deciduous, herb with an underground tuber and a single thin leaf 150–280 mm (6–10 in) long with the free part 10–22 mm (0.4–0.9 in) long. Between three and ten dark purple flowers are crowded along a flowering stem 10–30 mm (0.4–1 in) long and much taller than the leaf. The flowers are about 10 mm (0.4 in) long, 8.5 mm (0.3 in) wide and as with others in the genus, are inverted so that the labellum is above the column rather than below it. The dorsal sepal is 6 mm (0.2 in) long, 3 mm (0.1 in) wide with darker stripes, a pointed tip and hairy edges. The lateral sepals are 7.5 mm (0.3 in) long, 1 mm (0.04 in) wide with a humped base and spread widely apart from each other. The petals are 4 mm (0.2 in) long, 1.5 mm (0.06 in) wide and striped with hairy edges. The labellum is about 5 mm (0.2 in) long, 1.5 mm (0.06 in) wide with its tip curled upwards and long hairs on its edge. The labellum quivers in the slightest breeze. Flowering occurs between February and April.

== Taxonomy and naming ==
Genoplesium ostrinum was first formally described in 2001 by David Jones and the description was published in The Orchadian. In 2002, Jones and Mark Clements changed the name to Corunastylis ostrina but the change is not accepted by the Australian Plant Census. The specific epithet (ostrinum) is a Latin word meaning "purple".

== Distribution and habitat ==
The purple midge orchid grows with shrubs or grasses in woodland between Tallong and Braidwood.
