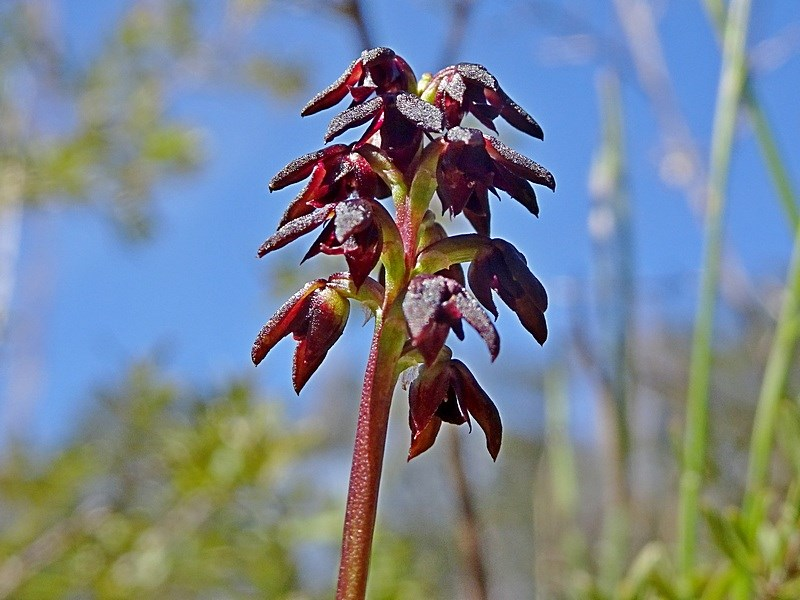

Conservation status
- Vulnerable (EPBC Act)

Scientific classification
- Kingdom: Plantae
- Clade: Tracheophytes
- Clade: Angiosperms
- Clade: Monocots
- Order: Asparagales
- Family: Orchidaceae
- Subfamily: Orchidoideae
- Tribe: Diurideae
- Genus: Genoplesium
- Species: G. vernale

Binomial name
- Genoplesium vernale D.L.Jones

Synonyms
- Corunastylis vernalis (D.L.Jones) D.L.Jones & M.A.Clem.

= Genoplesium vernale =

Spring midge orchid

Species of orchid

Genoplesium vernale, commonly known as the spring midge orchid or East Lynne midge orchid, is a small terrestrial orchid which is endemic to a small area on the south coast of New South Wales. It has a single thin leaf and up to twenty five dark purplish-black flowers with tiny glandular hairs on the sepals and petals.

== Description ==
Genoplesium vernale is a terrestrial, perennial, deciduous, herb with an underground tuber and a single thin, dark green leaf 100–180 mm (4–7 in) long and reddish at the base with the free part of the leaf 10–15 mm (0.4–0.6 in) long. Between ten and twenty five dark purplish-black flowers are crowded along a flowering stem 20–40 mm (0.8–2 in) long reaching to a height of 150–250 mm (6–10 in). The flowers lean downwards and are about 6 mm (0.2 in) long, 4.5 mm (0.2 in) wide and as with others in the genus, are inverted so that the labellum is above the column rather than below it. The dorsal sepal is broadly egg-shaped, 3.5 mm (0.1 in) long, 2.5 mm (0.1 in) wide with a sharply pointed tip and tiny glandular hairs on its edges. The lateral sepals are narrow oblong to lance-shaped, 4.5 mm (0.2 in) long, 1.5 mm (0.06 in) wide with a humped base, tiny glandular hairs on its edges and are more or less parallel to each other. The petals are lance-shaped to narrow egg-shaped, 3 mm (0.1 in) long, 1 mm (0.04 in) wide with a sharply pointed tip and tiny glandular hairs on the edges. The labellum is narrow oblong to elliptic in shape, about 3 mm (0.1 in) long, 1.5 mm (0.06 in) wide, thick and fleshy with tiny glandular hairs on its edges. There is a dark purple to brownish-black callus in the centre of the labellum and extending almost to its tip. Flowering occurs between September and December.

== Taxonomy and naming ==
Genoplesium vernale was first formally described in 2001 by David Jones and the description was published in The Orchadian. In 2002, Jones and Mark Clements changed the name to Corunastylis vernalis. The specific epithet (vernale) is a Latin word meaning "spring".

== Distribution and habitat ==
The spring midge orchid grows in shrubby forest between Jervis Bay and Mogo.

== Conservation ==
Genoplesium vernale is only known from a narrow belt of forest about 12 km (7 mi) wide. A survey conducted in 2000 found about 450 plants but the number is probably greater since not all suitable habitat has been surveyed. The main threats to the species are land clearing, forestry operations and inappropriate fire regimes. The species is listed as "Vulnerable" under the Commonwealth Government Environment Protection and Biodiversity Conservation Act 1999 (EPBC) Act and the New South Wales Threatened Species Conservation Act 1995.
