= Genoplesium insigne =

Dark midge orchid

Conservation status
- Critically endangered (EPBC Act)

Scientific classification
- Kingdom: Plantae
- Clade: Tracheophytes
- Clade: Angiosperms
- Clade: Monocots
- Order: Asparagales
- Family: Orchidaceae
- Subfamily: Orchidoideae
- Tribe: Diurideae
- Genus: Genoplesium
- Species: G. insigne

Binomial name
- Genoplesium insigne D.L.Jones

Synonyms
- Corunastylis insignis (D.L.Jones) D.L.Jones & M.A.Clem.

Species of orchid

Genoplesium insigne, commonly known as the dark midge orchid or Wyong midge orchid, is a species of small terrestrial orchid that is endemic to New South Wales. It has a single thin leaf and up to twelve dark purple to dark reddish purple flowers. It is mostly found in heath on the Central Coast and only around fifty plants survive.

== Description ==
Genoplesium insigne is a terrestrial, perennial, deciduous, herb with an underground tuber and a single thin, dark green leaf with a reddish base. The leaf is 60–150 mm (2–6 in) long, about 1.5 mm (0.06 in) wide with the free part 10–15 mm (0.4–0.6 in) long. Between five and twelve dark purple to dark reddish purple flowers are arranged along a flowering stem 90–180 mm (4–7 in) tall and taller than the leaf. The flowers are about 5 mm (0.2 in) wide and as with others in the genus, are inverted so that the labellum is above the column rather than below it. The dorsal sepal is lance-shaped to egg-shaped, 5–5.5 mm (0.20–0.22 in) long, 2.5 mm (0.1 in) wide and concave. The lateral sepals are linear to lance-shaped, 6.5–7 mm (0.26–0.28 in) long, about 1 mm (0.04 in) wide and more or less parallel to each other. The petals are lance-shaped to narrow egg-shaped, 4.5–5 mm (0.18–0.20 in) long and 1 mm (0.04 in) wide. The labellum is egg-shaped to elliptic, about 4 mm (0.2 in) long, 2 mm (0.08 in) wide with purple hairs up to 1 mm (0.04 in) long on the sides. There is a fleshy, dark purplish black callus in the centre of the labellum and covering less than half of it. Flowering occurs between August and November.

== Taxonomy and naming ==
Genoplesium insigne was first formally described in 2001 by David Jones who published the description in The Orchadian from a specimen collected in the Lake Macquarie State Recreation Area. In 2002, Jones and Mark Clements changed the name to Corunastylis insignis but the change is not accepted by the Australian Plant Census. The specific epithet (insigne) is a Latin word meaning "remarkable", "eminent" or "distinguished".

== Distribution and habitat ==
The dark midge orchid grows in heath and heathy forest, in four small areas between Chain Valley Bay and Wyong with a further small population near Lake Macquarie.

== Conservation ==
It is difficult to determine the precise number of plants of the G. insigne because they are difficult to locate and weather conditions affect whether or not the plants flower. There are estimated to be around fifty plants surviving. The species is classed as "Critically Endangered" under the New South Wales Threatened Species Conservation Act and the Commonwealth Government Environment Protection and Biodiversity Conservation Act 1999 (EPBC) Act. The main threats to the species are weed invasion, habitat disturbance, grazing by rabbits and illegal collecting.
