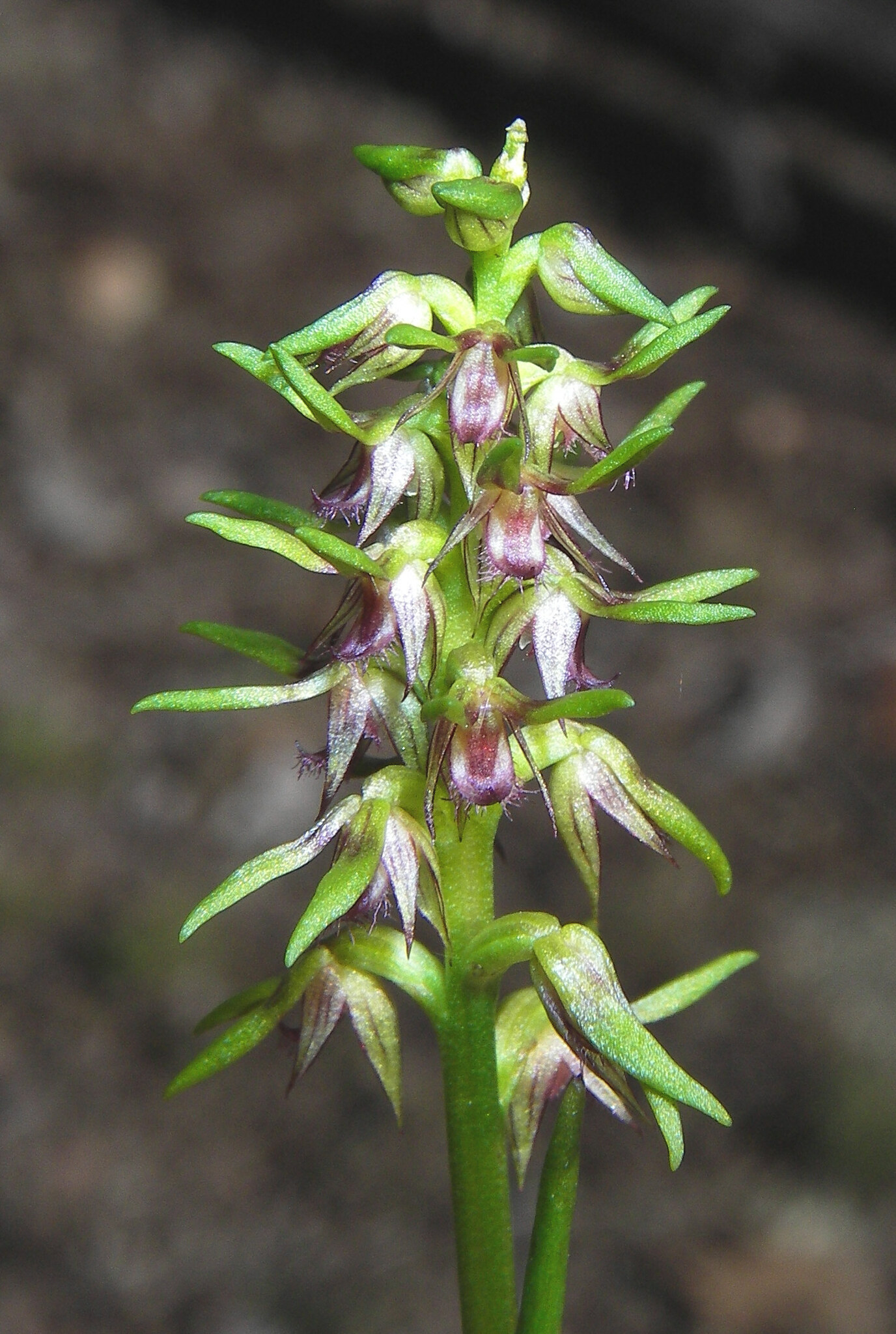
- Near Inverell

Scientific classification
- Kingdom: Plantae
- Clade: Tracheophytes
- Clade: Angiosperms
- Clade: Monocots
- Order: Asparagales
- Family: Orchidaceae
- Subfamily: Orchidoideae
- Tribe: Diurideae
- Genus: Genoplesium
- Species: G. tenellum

Binomial name
- Genoplesium tenellum (D.L.Jones & L.M.Copel.) J.M.H.Shaw

Synonyms
- Corunastylis tenella D.L.Jones & L.M.Copel.

= Genoplesium tenellum =

Species of orchid

Genoplesium tenellum is a species of small terrestrial orchid that is endemic to eastern Australia. It has a single leaf fused to the flowering stem and between 5 and 21 green flowers with reddish-purple lines and markings.

== Description ==
Genoplesium tenellum is a terrestrial, perennial, deciduous, herb with an underground tuber and a single cylindrical leaf 100–200 mm (3.9–7.9 in) long, sheathing the flowering stem with the free part 10–20 mm (0.39–0.79 in) long and about 2 mm (0.079 in) wide. Between 5 and 21 green flowers with reddish-purple lines and markings are arranged along a flowering stem 100–200 mm (3.9–7.9 in) long. The flowers are 4–5 mm (0.16–0.20 in) long and about 4 mm (0.16 in) wide. As with others in the genus, the flowers are inverted so that the labellum is above the column rather than below it. The dorsal sepal is narrowly egg-shaped and forms a hood over the column, about 4 mm (0.16 in) long, 1.6 mm (0.063 in) wide and pale green with red lines and markings. The lateral sepals are linear, 3.5–4.0 mm (0.14–0.16 in) long, about 0.8 mm (0.031 in) wide, and spread apart with a slightly swollen base. The petals are narrowly egg-shaped, 2.5–3.0 mm (0.098–0.118 in) long and about 1.2 mm (0.047 in) wide with red edges and a red stripe along the centre. The labellum is egg-shaped with the narrower end towards the base, about 2.2 mm (0.087 in) long and 1.2 mm (0.047 in) wide with reddish-purple hairs. There is a purple callus covering the base of the labellum and extending nearly to its tip. Flowering has been observed from Late January to late May.

== Taxonomy and naming ==
This species of orchid was first formally described in 2013 by David Jones and Lachlan Copeland who gave it the name Corunastylis tenella in The Orchadian from specimens Copeland collected near Inverell in 2004. In 2016, Julian Shaw changed the name to Genoplesium tenellum in the Quarterly Supplement to the International Register of Orchid Hybrids (Sander's List) and the name is accepted by Plants of the World Online. The specific epithet (tenellum) means "delicate' or "dainty", referring to the habit and appearance of this species.

== Distribution and habitat ==
Genoplesium tenellum grows in woodland with shrubs and scattered trees around the edges of granite outcrops at altitudes of 710–1,000 m (2,330–3,280 ft). It is only known from near Torrington in northern New South Wales and Stanthorpe in far south-eastern Queensland.
