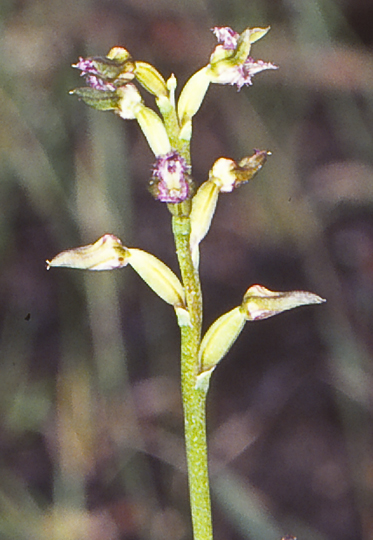
- Genoplesium apostasioides growing near Bomaderry

Scientific classification
- Kingdom: Plantae
- Clade: Tracheophytes
- Clade: Angiosperms
- Clade: Monocots
- Order: Asparagales
- Family: Orchidaceae
- Subfamily: Orchidoideae
- Tribe: Diurideae
- Genus: Genoplesium
- Species: G. apostasioides

Binomial name
- Genoplesium apostasioides (Fitzg.) D.L.Jones & M.A.Clem.

Synonyms
- Corunastylis apostasioides Fitzg.; Prasophyllum apostasioides (Fitzg.) F.Muell.; Anticheirostylis apostasioides (Fitzg.) Fitzg.

= Genoplesium apostasioides =

Freak midge orchid

Species of orchid

Genoplesium apostasioides, commonly known as the freak midge orchid, is a small terrestrial orchid endemic to New South Wales. It has a single thin leaf fused to the flowering stem and up to fifteen small, yellowish green flowers with a reddish labellum. The flowers do not open widely and are self-pollinating. It grows in heath and shallow moss gardens on rock ledges from the Blue Mountains to Nerriga.

== Description ==
Genoplesium apostasioides is a terrestrial, perennial, deciduous, herb with an underground tuber and a single thin leaf 150–300 mm (6–10 in) long and fused to the flowering stem with the free part 15–25 mm (0.6–1 in) long. Between three and fifteen yellowish-green flowers are widely spaced along a flowering stem 20–40 mm (0.8–2 in) tall and much taller than the leaf. The flowers are 4–5.5 mm (0.2–0.2 in) long and open erratically, or do not open at all and are self-pollinating. As with others in the genus, the flowers are inverted so that the labellum is above the column rather than below it. The dorsal sepal is lance-shaped to egg-shaped, about 5 mm (0.20 in) long and 2.5 mm (0.1 in) wide with hairy edges. The lateral sepals are linear to lance-shaped, about 6.5 mm (0.3 in) long, 2 mm (0.08 in) wide, more or less parallel to each other and sometimes have a gland on the tip. The petals are lance-shaped to egg-shaped, about 4 mm (0.2 in) long, 1.5 mm (0.06 in) wide with hairy edges and a sharply pointed tip. The labellum is reddish, about 7.5 mm (0.3 in) long, 2 mm (0.08 in) wide, with hairy edges and a sharply pointed tip. There is a callus in the centre of the labellum and extending nearly to its tip. Flowering occurs from December to April.

== Taxonomy and naming ==
The freak midge orchid was first formally described in 1888 by Robert D. FitzGerald who gave it the name Corunastylis apostasioides from a specimen collected near Berrima, and published the description in his book Australian Orchids. In 1989, David Jones and Mark Alwin Clements changed the name to Genoplesium apostasioides.

== Distribution and habitat ==
Genoplesium apostasioides grows in forest and in moss gardens on rock shelves, on the tablelands between the Blue Mountains and Nerriga.
