= Genoplesium systenum =

Kangarooby midge orchid

Scientific classification
- Kingdom: Plantae
- Clade: Tracheophytes
- Clade: Angiosperms
- Clade: Monocots
- Order: Asparagales
- Family: Orchidaceae
- Subfamily: Orchidoideae
- Tribe: Diurideae
- Genus: Genoplesium
- Species: G. systenum

Binomial name
- Genoplesium systenum D.L.Jones

Synonyms
- Corunastylis systena (D.L.Jones) D.L.Jones & M.A.Clem.

Species of orchid

Genoplesium superbum, commonly known as the Kangarooby midge orchid, is a species of small terrestrial orchid that is endemic to New South Wales. It has a single thin leaf and up to thirty two hairy, light reddish flowers which lean downwards and have a dark purple labellum.

== Description ==
Genoplesium systenum is a terrestrial, perennial, deciduous, herb with an underground tuber and a single thin leaf 120–300 mm (5–10 in) long with the free part 15–25 mm (0.6–1 in) long. Between twelve and thirty two light reddish flowers are arranged along a flowering stem 30–60 mm (1–2 in) long, reaching to a height of 150–360 mm (6–10 in). The flowers lean downwards and are about 6 mm (0.2 in) wide. As with others in the genus, the flowers are inverted so that the labellum is above the column rather than below it. The dorsal sepal is broadly egg-shaped, about 3.5 mm (0.1 in) long, 2.5 mm (0.1 in) wide and greenish with reddish-purple bands and hairy edges. The lateral sepals are linear to lance-shaped, about 5 mm (0.2 in) long, 1.5 mm (0.06 in) wide, light reddish green and spread widely apart from each other. The petals are narrow egg-shaped, about 3 mm (0.1 in) long, 1 mm (0.04 in) wide with hairy edges and a similar colour to the dorsal sepal. The labellum is narrow egg-shaped, dark purple, about 3.5 mm (0.1 in) long and 1.5 mm (0.06 in) wide with coarse, spreading hairs up to 1 mm (0.04 in) long on its edges. There is a dark purple callus in the centre of the labellum and covering about three-quarters of its surface. Flowering occurs from February to April.

== Taxonomy and naming ==
The Kangarooby midge orchid was first formally described in 1991 by David Jones and the description was published in Australian Orchid Research. In 2002, Jones and Mark Clements changed the name to Corunastylis systena but that name is not accepted by the Australian Plant Census. The specific epithet (systenum) derived from the Ancient Greek word systenos meaning "tapering to a point", referring to the shape of the labellum of this orchid. (Kangarooby is a locality near Forbes.)

== Distribution and habitat ==
Genoplesium systenum grows below shrubs in forested ridges and slopes on the ranges near Cowra, including the Conimbla National Park and Weddin Mountains National Park.
