= Genoplesium morinum =

Mulberry midge orchid

Scientific classification
- Kingdom: Plantae
- Clade: Tracheophytes
- Clade: Angiosperms
- Clade: Monocots
- Order: Asparagales
- Family: Orchidaceae
- Subfamily: Orchidoideae
- Tribe: Diurideae
- Genus: Genoplesium
- Species: G. morinum

Binomial name
- Genoplesium morinum D.L.Jones

Synonyms
- Corunastylis morina (D.L.Jones) D.L.Jones & M.A.Clem.

Species of orchid

Genoplesium morinum, commonly known as the mulberry midge orchid, is a species of small terrestrial orchid that is endemic to New South Wales. It has a single thin leaf fused to the flowering stem and up to twenty crowded, dark reddish purple flowers. It has been known as "mulberries on sticks".

== Description ==
Genoplesium morinum is a terrestrial, perennial, deciduous, herb with an underground tuber and a single thin, dark green leaf, 120–200 mm (5–8 in) long with a purplish base and fused to the flowering stem with the free part 12–20 mm (0.5–0.8 in) long. The leaf sometimes remains attached to the tuber until the plant flowers in the next year. Between ten and twenty dark reddish purple flowers are crowded along 20–30 mm (0.8–1 in) of a flowering stem reaching to a height of 150–240 mm (6–9 in). The flowers lean downwards, are 6–7 mm (0.2–0.3 in) long, 5–6 mm (0.20–0.24 in) wide and inverted so that the labellum is above the column rather than below it. The dorsal sepal is egg-shaped, about 6 mm (0.2 in) long and 3 mm (0.1 in) wide with dark red lines. The lateral sepals are linear to lance-shaped, 6.5–7 mm (0.26–0.28 in) long, 1.5–2 mm (0.06–0.08 in) wide, point downwards and spread apart from each other. The petals are broadly egg-shaped, about 5.5 mm (0.2 in) long and 2 mm (0.08 in) wide with darker lines. The petals have irregular edges with coarse, purple hairs up to 0.5 mm (0.02 in) long. The labellum is dark purplish red, linear to elliptic in shape, about 4.5 mm (0.2 in) long, 2 mm (0.08 in) wide with purplish hairs up to 1 mm (0.04 in) on its edges. There is a thick, fleshy, dark purplish black callus in the centre of the labellum and extending almost to its tip. Flowering occurs from November to January.

== Taxonomy and naming ==
Genoplesium morinum was first formally described in 1991 by David Jones from a specimen collected in the Kanangra-Boyd National Park and the description was published in The Orchadian. In 2002, David Jones and Mark Clements changed the name to Corunastylis morina but the change is not accepted by the Australian Plant Census. The specific epithet (morinum) is derived from the Latin word meaning "mulberry coloured", referring to the flower colour.

Prior to its formal description, William Nicholls noted the cattlemen knew this species as "mulberries on sticks".

== Distribution and habitat ==
Genoplesium morinum grows with sedges in swampy places at altitudes of about 1,000 ft (10,000 in) in the Kanangra-Boyd National Park.
