= Genoplesium capparinum =

Scientific classification
- Kingdom: Plantae
- Clade: Tracheophytes
- Clade: Angiosperms
- Clade: Monocots
- Order: Asparagales
- Family: Orchidaceae
- Subfamily: Orchidoideae
- Tribe: Diurideae
- Genus: Genoplesium
- Species: G. capparinum

Binomial name
- Genoplesium capparinum D.L.Jones

Synonyms
- Corunastylis capparina D.L.Jones

Species of orchid

Genoplesium capparinum, (known as Corunastylis capparina in Victoria) is a small terrestrial orchid endemic to Victoria. It is one of the midge orchids and has a single thin leaf fused to the flowering stem and up to twenty small, green flowers with purple markings. It is a rare species, found only in a small area in the south-east of the state.

== Description ==
Genoplesium capparinum is a terrestrial, perennial, deciduous, herb with an underground tuber and a single thin leaf fused to the flowering stem. Between two and twenty flowers are arranged along a flowering stem 10–30 mm (0.4–1 in) long, reaching to a height of 80–250 mm (3–10 in) and taller than the leaf. The flowers are green with purple markings, sometimes entirely purple and are 3.5–4 mm (0.14–0.16 in) wide. As with others in the genus, the flowers are inverted so that the labellum is above the column rather than below it. The dorsal sepal is broadly egg-shaped, about 3 mm (0.1 in) long and 2.5 mm (0.1 in) wide. The lateral sepals are linear to lance-shaped, 4–4.5 mm (0.16–0.18 in) long, 1–1.5 mm (0.04–0.06 in) wide and spread apart from each other. The petals are lance-shaped to egg-shaped, about 2.5 mm (0.1 in) long and 1 mm (0.04 in) wide with darker edges and a pointed tip. The labellum is wedge-shaped, thick and fleshy, 2.5–3 mm (0.098–0.12 in) long and 1.5–2 mm (0.06–0.08 in) wide with slightly wavy edges. There is a narrow egg-shaped callus in the centre of the labellum and extending almost to its tip. Flowering occurs in March and April.

== Taxonomy and naming ==
This species was first formally described in 2016 by David Jones, who gave it the name Corunastylis capparina in the Australian Orchid Review from a specimen collected in the Blond Bay Wildlife Reserve. The specific epithet (capparina) is a vague Latin word meaning greenish-brown, referring to the colour of the flowers of this species.

In 2017, Julian Shaw changed the name of this orchid to Genoplesium capparinum in the Quarterly Supplement to the International Register of Orchid Hybrids (Sander's List), and that name is accepted by Plants of the World Online. The name Corunastylis capparina is accepted by the National Herbarium of Victoria.

== Distribution and habitat ==
This midge orchid grows in heath and heathy forest between Sale and Bairnsdale.
