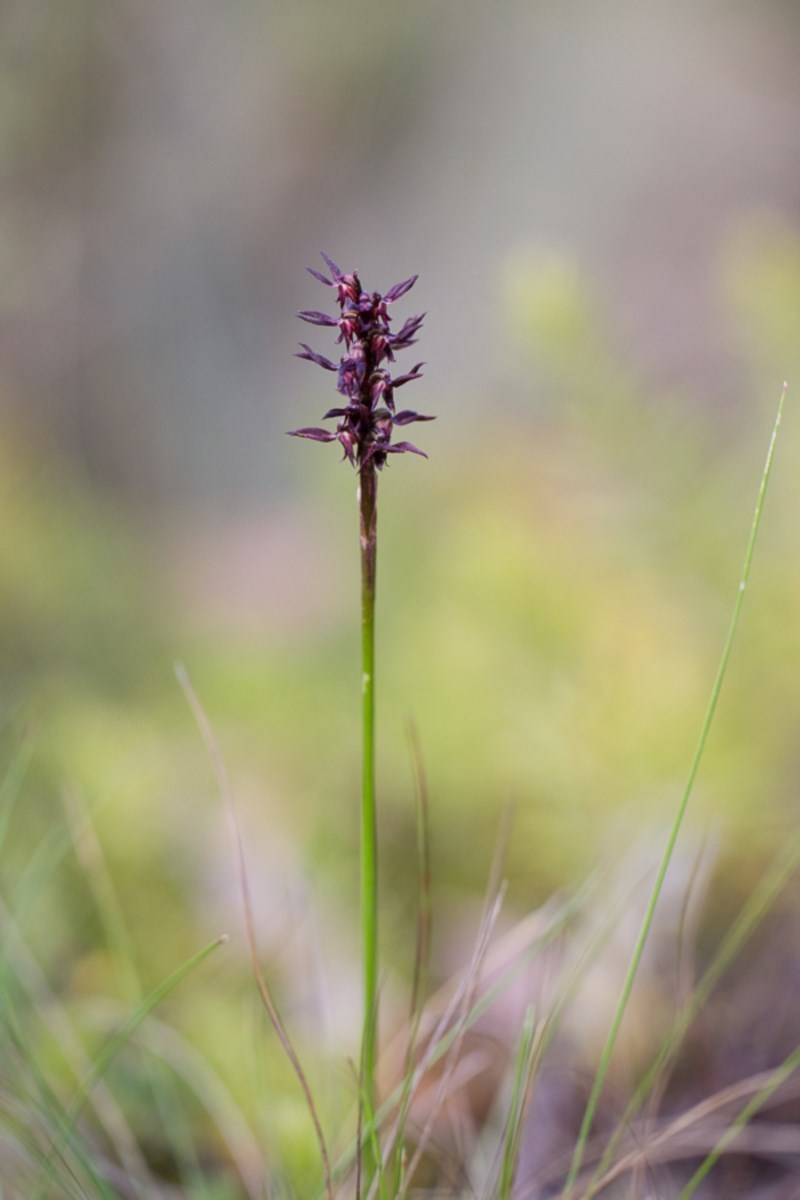
- In Namadgi National Park

Scientific classification
- Kingdom: Plantae
- Clade: Tracheophytes
- Clade: Angiosperms
- Clade: Monocots
- Order: Asparagales
- Family: Orchidaceae
- Subfamily: Orchidoideae
- Tribe: Diurideae
- Genus: Genoplesium
- Species: G. arrectum

Binomial name
- Genoplesium arrectum D.L.Jones

Synonyms
- Corunastylis arrecta (D.L.Jones) D.L.Jones & M.A.Clem.

= Genoplesium arrectum =

Erect midge orchid

Species of orchid

Genoplesium arrectum, commonly known as erect midge orchid and as Corunastylis arrecta in Australia, is a small terrestrial orchid endemic to south-eastern Australia. It has a single thin leaf fused to the flowering stem and up to twenty small, dark purple flowers. It grows in a montane and subalpine grassland and forest in Victoria and the Australian Capital Territory.

== Description ==
Genoplesium arrectum is a terrestrial, perennial, deciduous, herb with an underground tuber and a single thin leaf 100–180 mm (4–7 in) long and fused to the flowering stem with the free part 10–15 mm (0.4–0.6 in) long. Between three and twenty dark purple flowers are crowded along a flowering stem 20–35 mm (0.8–1 in) tall and taller than the leaf. The flowers are about 6 mm (0.2 in) long, 3 mm (0.1 in) wide and are inverted so that the labellum is above the column rather than below it. The dorsal sepal is a broad egg shape, about 4 mm (0.2 in) long and 2.5 mm (0.1 in) wide with hairless edges and dark coloured bands. The lateral sepals are linear to lance-shaped, about 5 mm (0.2 in) long, 1 mm (0.04 in) wide, stiffly erect and more or less parallel to each other. The petals are a narrow egg shape, about 3.5 mm (0.1 in) long and 1 mm (0.04 in) wide with dark coloured bands and hairless edges. The labellum is elliptic to broadly egg-shaped, about 3 mm (0.1 in) long, 2 mm (0.08 in) wide, thick and fleshy with coarse hairs on its edges. There is a narrow egg-shaped callus in the centre of the labellum and extending three-quarters of the way to its tip. Flowering occurs in December and January.

== Taxonomy and naming ==
Genoplesium arrectum was first formally described in 1991 by David Jones from a specimen collected near Omeo and the description was published in Australian Orchid Research. In 2002 Jones and Mark Clements changed the name to Corunastylis arrecta. The specific epithet (arrecta) is a Latin word meaning "upright", referring to the stiffly erect lateral sepals.

== Distribution and habitat ==
Genoplesium arrectum grows in grassland and grassy forest at altitudes above 900 m (3,000 ft) in north-eastern Victoria and in the Australian Capital Territory.
