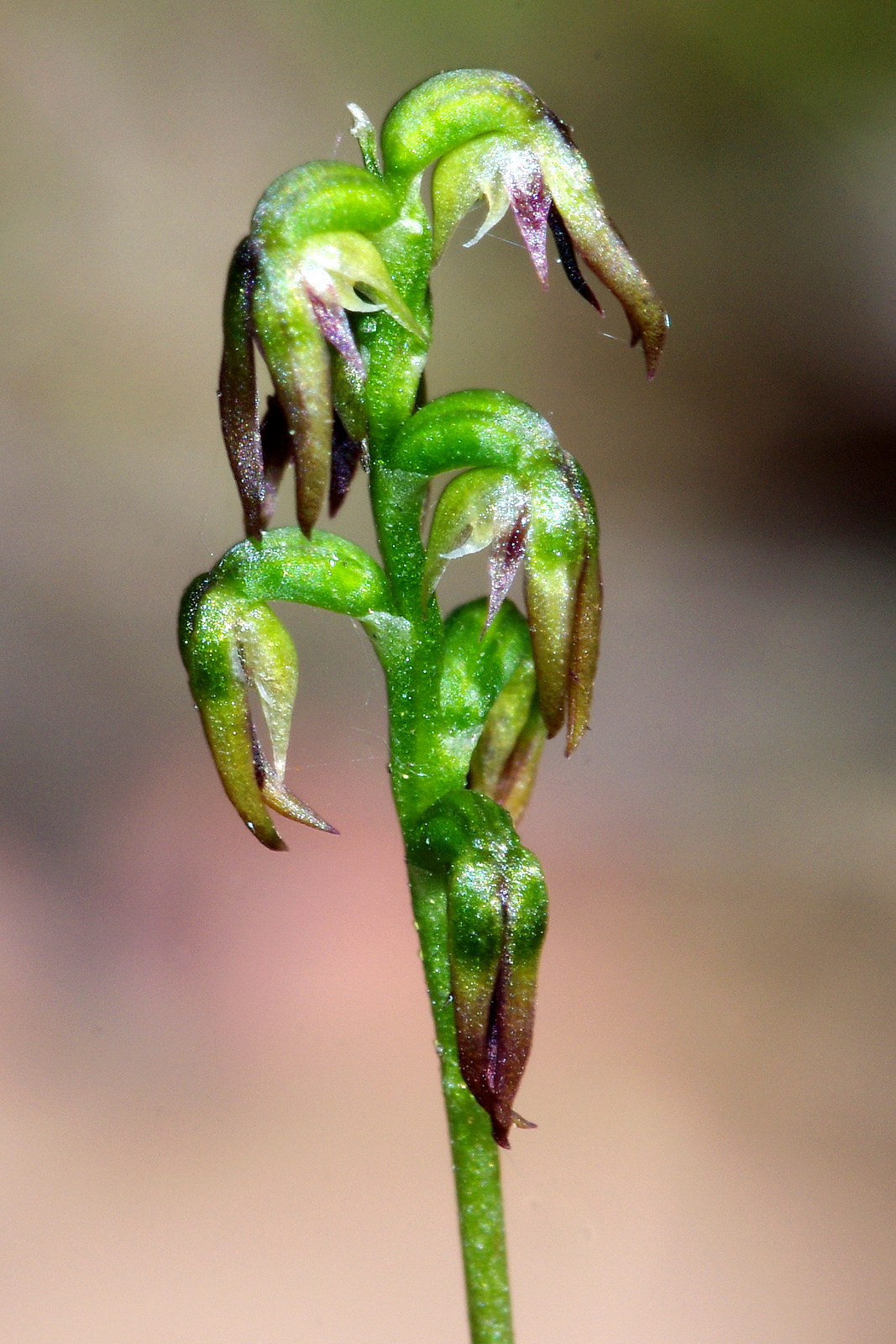

Scientific classification
- Kingdom: Plantae
- Clade: Tracheophytes
- Clade: Angiosperms
- Clade: Monocots
- Order: Asparagales
- Family: Orchidaceae
- Subfamily: Orchidoideae
- Tribe: Diurideae
- Genus: Genoplesium
- Species: G. despectans

Binomial name
- Genoplesium despectans (Hook.f.)D.L.Jones & M.A.Clem.

Synonyms
- Corunastylis despectans (Hook.f.) D.L.Jones & M.A.Clem.; Prasophyllum despectans Hook.f.; Corunastylis exigua (Rupp) D.L.Jones & M.A.Clem. not validly publ.; Prasophyllum despectans var. intermedium Ewart & B.Rees nom. illeg.; Prasophyllum exiguum Rupp

= Genoplesium despectans =

Sharp midge orchid

Species of orchid

Genoplesium despectans, commonly known as sharp midge orchid and known as Corunastylis despectans in Australia, is a small terrestrial orchid endemic to south-eastern Australia. It has a single thin leaf fused to the flowering stem and up to forty five small, dark purple or green and purple flowers.

== Description ==
Genoplesium despectans is a terrestrial, perennial, deciduous, herb with an underground tuber and a single thin leaf 150–250 mm (6–10 in) long and fused to the flowering stem with the free part 10–15 mm (0.4–0.6 in) long. Up to forty five dark purple or green and purple flowers are crowded along a flowering stem 20–40 mm (0.8–2 in) tall. The flowers lean downwards and are about 5.5 mm (0.2 in) long and 3–4 mm (0.1–0.2 in) wide. The flowers are inverted so that the labellum is above the column rather than below it. The dorsal sepal is egg-shaped, about 3 mm (0.1 in) long and about 2 mm (0.08 in) wide. The lateral sepals are linear to lance-shaped, about 4 mm (0.2 in) long, 1 mm (0.04 in) wide and spread apart from each other. The petals are egg-shaped, about 2 mm (0.08 in) long and 1 mm (0.04 in) wide with a pointed tip. The labellum is lance-shaped, thick and fleshy, about 3 mm (0.1 in) long, 1 mm (0.04 in) wide and sharply pointed with fine teeth along its edges. There is a narrow lance-shaped callus in the centre of the labellum and extending almost to its tip. Flowering occurs between December and April.

== Taxonomy and naming ==
Sharp midge orchid was first formally described in 1858 by Joseph Dalton Hooker who gave it the name Prasophyllum despectans and published the description in Flora Antarctica. In 1989, David Jones and Mark Clements changed the name to Genoplesium despectans and in 2002 changed the name again to Corunastylis despectans. The specific epithet (despectans) is derived from a Latin word meaning "to look down upon".

== Distribution and habitat ==
Genoplesium despectans grows in heath and heathy forest south from Wollongong in New South Wales and is common and widespread in Victoria. It also found in the south-east of South Australia and in Tasmania.
