= Genoplesium citriodorum =

Lemon-scented midge orchid

Scientific classification
- Kingdom: Plantae
- Clade: Tracheophytes
- Clade: Angiosperms
- Clade: Monocots
- Order: Asparagales
- Family: Orchidaceae
- Subfamily: Orchidoideae
- Tribe: Diurideae
- Genus: Genoplesium
- Species: G. citriodorum

Binomial name
- Genoplesium citriodorum D.L.Jones & M.A.Clem.

Synonyms
- Corunastylis citriodora (D.L.Jones & M.A.Clem.) D.L.Jones & M.A.Clem.

Species of orchid

Genoplesium citriodorum, commonly known as the lemon-scented midge orchid, is a species of small terrestrial orchid that is endemic to New South Wales. It has a single thin leaf fused to the flowering stem and up to thirty three small, lemon scented, dark purplish black flowers. It usually grows under shrubs in shallow sandstone soil in the Blue Mountains.

== Description ==
Genoplesium citriodorum is a terrestrial, perennial, deciduous, herb with an underground tuber and a single thin leaf 200–300 mm (8–10 in) long and fused to the flowering stem with the free part 15–20 mm (0.6–0.8 in) long. Between twenty and thirty three dark purplish black flowers are arranged along a flowering stem 30–40 mm (1–2 in) tall and taller than the leaf. The flowers are about 6 mm (0.24 in) long and 5 mm (0.20 in) wide and lean forward. As with others in the genus, the flowers are inverted so that the labellum is above the column rather than below it. The dorsal sepal is narrow egg-shaped, about 5 mm (0.20 in) long and 2 mm (0.08 in) wide with prominent red lines and sparsely hairy edges. The lateral sepals are about 5.5 mm (0.2 in) long, 1.5 mm (0.06 in) wide, turn downwards and spread widely apart from each other. The petals are narrow egg-shaped, about 3.5 mm (0.1 in) long, 1 mm (0.04 in) wide with prominent stripes and hairy edges. The labellum is purple, narrow egg-shaped, about 4 mm (0.2 in) long, 1.5 mm (0.06 in) wide, with many hairs up to 1 mm (0.04 in) on its edges. There is a dark reddish purple callus in the centre of the labellum and extending two-thirds of the way to its tip. Flowering occurs between December and April.

== Taxonomy and naming ==
The lemon scented midge orchid was first formally described in 1991 by David Jones and Mark Clements who gave it the name Genoplesium citriodorum and published the description in Australian Orchid Research. In 2002, Jones and Clements changed the name to Corunastylis citriodora but the change is not accepted by the Australian Plant Census. The specific epithet (citriodorum) is derived from the Latin words citrea meaning "the citron-tree" and odor meaning "smell", referring to the strongly lemon-scented flowers.

== Distribution and habitat ==
Genoplesium citriodorum is only known from the Blue Mountains at heights of 900–1,200 m (3,000–4,000 ft) where it grows under shrubs in shallow soil over sandstone and sometimes in permanently wet areas.
