= Genoplesium firthii =

Firth's midge orchid

Conservation status
- Critically endangered (EPBC Act)

Scientific classification
- Kingdom: Plantae
- Clade: Tracheophytes
- Clade: Angiosperms
- Clade: Monocots
- Order: Asparagales
- Family: Orchidaceae
- Subfamily: Orchidoideae
- Tribe: Diurideae
- Genus: Genoplesium
- Species: G. firthii

Binomial name
- Genoplesium firthii (Cady)D.L.Jones & M.A.Clem.

Synonyms
- Prasophyllum firthii Cady; Corunastylis firthii (Cady) D.L.Jones & M.A.Clem.

Species of orchid

Genoplesium firthii, commonly known as Firth's midge orchid, is a species of small terrestrial orchid endemic to Tasmania. It has a single thin leaf fused to the flowering stem and up to six small, yellowish green or reddish flowers with a red labellum. It grows in coastal heath and scrub and is currently only known from a single population of about twelve plants near Coles Bay.

== Description ==
Genoplesium firthii is a terrestrial, perennial, deciduous, herb with an underground tuber and a single thin leaf 50–80 mm (2–3 in) long and fused to the flowering stem with the free part 5–10 mm (0.2–0.4 in) long. Up to six yellowish green or reddish flowers are arranged along a flowering stem 10–15 mm (0.4–0.6 in) tall and much taller than the leaf. The flowers lean downwards and are about 4.5 mm (0.2 in) long and 3 mm (0.1 in) wide. As with others in the genus, the flowers are inverted so that the labellum is above the column rather than below it. The dorsal sepal is about 3 mm (0.1 in) long and 2.5 mm (0.1 in) wide with a small gland on the tip. The lateral sepals turn downwards, are about 4 mm (0.2 in) long, 1 mm (0.04 in) wide and spread apart from each other. They also have a small gland on the tip. The petals are about 2 mm (0.08 in) long and 1 mm (0.04 in) wide with a pointed tip and hairless edges. The labellum is red, egg-shaped with the narrower end towards the base, about 2.5 mm (0.1 in) long, 1.5 mm (0.06 in) wide, with irregular edges and a pointed tip. There is a callus in the centre of the labellum and extending nearly to its tip. Flowering occurs from January to March.

== Taxonomy and naming ==
Firth's midge orchid was first formally described in 1971 by Leonard Cady who gave it the name Prasophyllum firthii from a specimen collected near Bicheno. The description was published in The Orchadian. In 1989, David Jones changed the name to Genoplesium firthii and in 2005 changed the name again to Corunastylis firthii but the last change is not accepted by the Australian Plant Census.

== Distribution and habitat ==
Genoplesium firthii grows on a roadside near Coles Bay.

== Conservation ==
Firth's midge orchid is only known from a single population containing about twelve plants. It was formerly also known to occur at Friendly Beaches Reserve but has not been seen there since 1973. The species is classified as Endangered under the Tasmanian Threatened Species Protection Act 1995 and as Critically Endangered under the Commonwealth Government Environment Protection and Biodiversity Conservation Act 1999 (EPBC) Act. The main threats to the species are road maintenance, trampling by people and cars, by weed invasion and inappropriate fire regimes.
