= Genoplesium acuminatum =

Pointed midge orchid

Scientific classification
- Kingdom: Plantae
- Clade: Tracheophytes
- Clade: Angiosperms
- Clade: Monocots
- Order: Asparagales
- Family: Orchidaceae
- Subfamily: Orchidoideae
- Tribe: Diurideae
- Genus: Genoplesium
- Species: G. acuminatum

Binomial name
- Genoplesium acuminatum (R.S.Rogers) D.L.Jones & M.A.Clem.

Synonyms
- Prasophyllum acuminatum R.S.Rogers; Corunastylis acuminata (R.S.Rogers) D.L.Jones & M.A.Clem.

Species of orchid

Genoplesium acuminatum, commonly known as the pointed midge orchid, is a small terrestrial orchid endemic to eastern Australia. It has a single thin leaf fused to the flowering stem and up to sixteen small, hairy, greenish purple to brownish purple flowers. It is found in coastal and near-coastal parts of New South Wales and Queensland.

== Description ==
Genoplesium acuminatum is a terrestrial, perennial, deciduous, herb with an underground tuber and a single thin leaf 100–350 mm (4–10 in) long and fused to the flowering stem with the free part 15–30 mm (0.6–1 in) long. Between six and sixteen greenish purple to brownish purple flowers are crowded along a flowering stem 20–60 mm (0.8–2 in) tall and taller than the leaf. The flowers are about 8 mm (0.3 in) long and 6 mm (0.2 in) wide and are inverted so that the labellum is above the column rather than below it. The dorsal sepal is broadly egg-shaped, about 4 mm (0.16 in) long and 2 mm (0.08 in) wide with long, coarse hairs on its edges. The lateral sepals are linear to lance-shaped, about 5 mm (0.2 in) long, 1.5 mm (0.06 in) wide, have pointed tips and spread widely apart from each other. The petals are lance-shaped to broad egg-shaped, about 3.5 mm (0.1 in) long and 1.5 mm (0.06 in) wide with hairy edges and a sharply pointed tip. The labellum is lance-shaped to egg-shaped, about 3 mm (0.1 in) long, 1.5 mm (0.06 in) wide, with a curled, sharply pointed tip and long, coarse hairs on the sides. There is an oblong callus in the centre of the labellum and extending about halfway to its tip. Flowering occurs between December and May.

== Taxonomy and naming ==
The pointed midge orchid was first formally described in 1927 by Richard Sanders Rogers who gave it the name Prasophyllum acuminatum and published the description in Transactions and Proceedings of the Royal Society of South Australia. In 1989, David Jones and Mark Clements changed the name to Genoplesium acuminatum and in 1998 changed the name again to Corunastylis acuminata, but the latter name change is not accepted by Plants of the World Online. The specific epithet (acuminatum) is a Latin word meaning "sharpened" or "pointed".

== Distribution and habitat ==
Genoplesium acuminatum grows in forest in coastal and near-coastal areas of New South Wales from near Sydney north to Fraser Island in Queensland.
