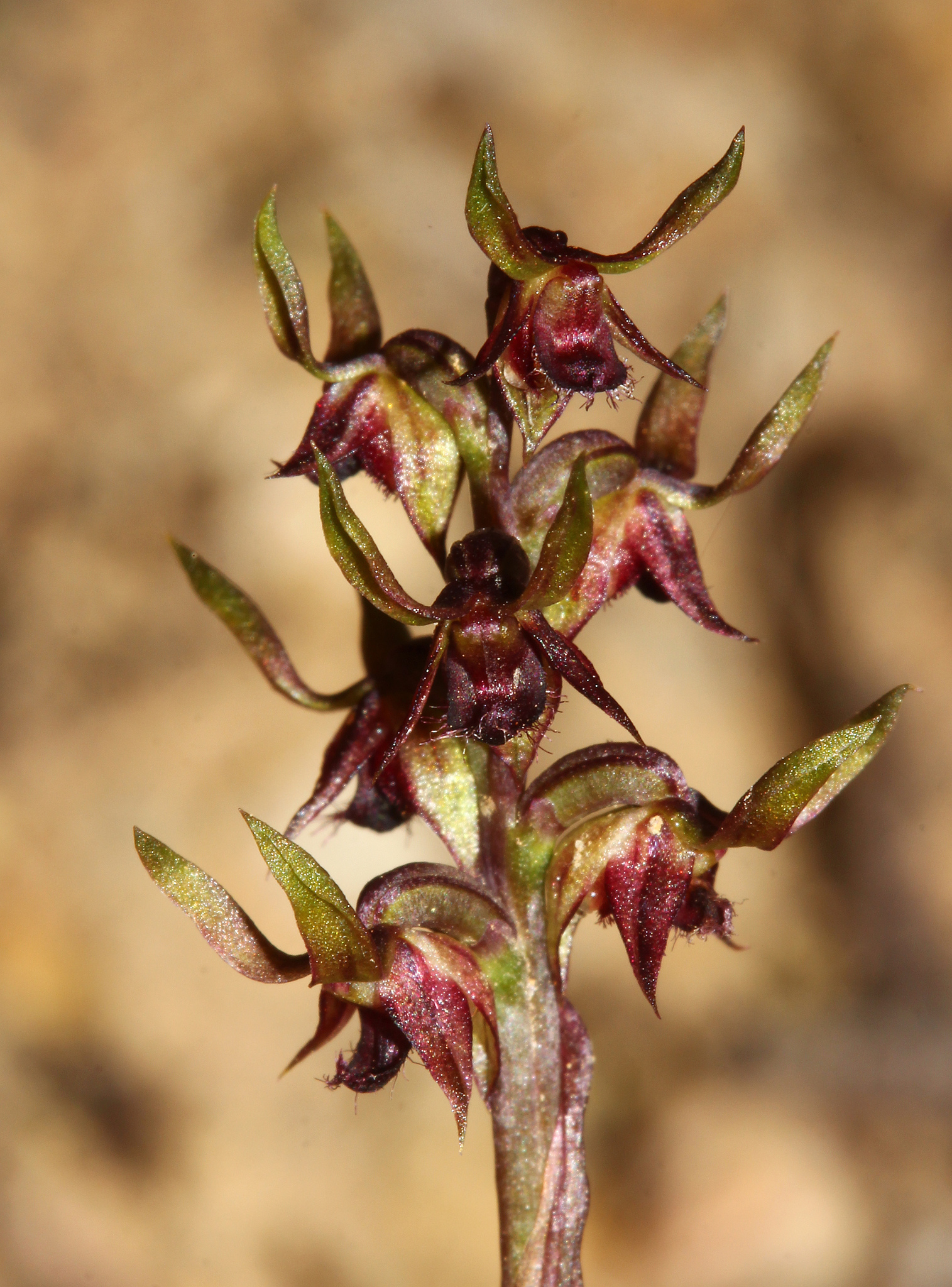

Scientific classification
- Kingdom: Plantae
- Clade: Tracheophytes
- Clade: Angiosperms
- Clade: Monocots
- Order: Asparagales
- Family: Orchidaceae
- Subfamily: Orchidoideae
- Tribe: Diurideae
- Genus: Genoplesium
- Species: G. formosum

Binomial name
- Genoplesium formosum D.L.Jones

Synonyms
- Corunastylis formosa (D.L.Jones) D.L.Jones & M.A.Clem.

= Genoplesium formosum =

Cathcart midge orchid

Species of orchid

Genoplesium formosum, commonly known as the Cathcart midge orchid, is a small terrestrial orchid found in southern New South Wales. It has a single thin leaf and up to twenty five dark reddish purple flowers with darker lines.

== Description ==
Genoplesium formosum is a terrestrial, perennial, deciduous, herb with an underground tuber and a single thin leaf 60–300 mm (2–10 in) long with the free part 10–20 mm (0.4–0.8 in) long. Between ten and twenty relatively large flowers are crowded along a flowering stem 20–40 mm (0.8–2 in) tall and slightly taller than the leaf. The flowers lean downwards, are dark reddish purple with darker lines and are 7–9 mm (0.3–0.4 in) long and 5–6 mm (0.20–0.24 in) wide. As with others in the genus, the flowers are inverted so that the labellum is above the column rather than below it. The dorsal sepal is 6.5–7 mm (0.26–0.28 in) long, 2.5–3 mm (0.098–0.12 in) wide with a sharply pointed tip. The lateral sepals are 8–9 mm (0.31–0.35 in) long, 1–2 mm (0.04–0.08 in) wide with a pointed tip and are free from each other. The petals are 6–6.5 mm (0.2–0.3 in) long, about 2 mm (0.08 in) wide and have a pointed tip and sometimes a few hairs on the edges. The labellum is egg-shaped with the narrower end towards the base, thick and fleshy, 4.5–5 mm (0.18–0.20 in) long, 2.5–3 mm (0.098–0.12 in) wide with a sharply pointed tip and coarse hairs on its edges. There is a callus in the centre of the labellum and extending nearly to its tip. Flowering occurs between October and December.

== Taxonomy and naming ==
Genoplesium formosum was first formally described in 2001 by David Jones from a specimen collected in the Wadbilliga National Park and the description was published in The Orchadian. In 2002 Jones and Mark Clements changed the name to Corunastylis formosa but the change is not accepted by the Australian Plant Census. The specific epithet (formosum) is a Latin word meaning “beautifully formed” or "handsome".

== Distribution and habitat ==
The Cathcart midge orchid grows with shrubs or grasses near streams or near swamps. It is found in isolated populations between Wadbilliga National Park and Cathcart.
