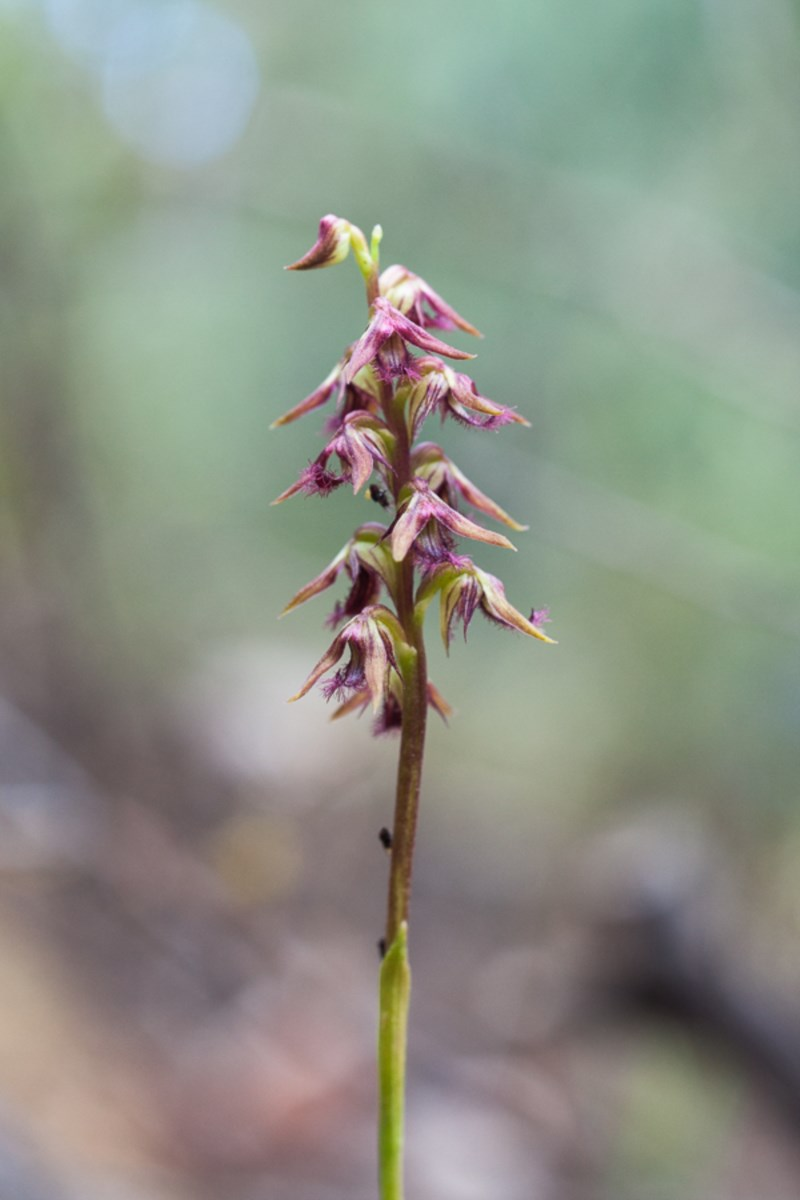
- In the Namadgi National Park

Conservation status
- Critically endangered (EPBC Act)

Scientific classification
- Kingdom: Plantae
- Clade: Tracheophytes
- Clade: Angiosperms
- Clade: Monocots
- Order: Asparagales
- Family: Orchidaceae
- Subfamily: Orchidoideae
- Tribe: Diurideae
- Genus: Genoplesium
- Species: G. ectopum

Binomial name
- Genoplesium ectopum D.L.Jones

Synonyms
- Corunastylis ectopa (D.L.Jones) D.L.Jones & M.A.Clem.

= Genoplesium ectopum =

Brindabella midge orchid

Species of orchid

Genoplesium ectopum, commonly known as the Brindabella spider orchid or ectopic midge orchid and as Corunastylis ectopa in Australia, is a small terrestrial orchid endemic to the Australian Capital Territory. It has a single thin leaf fused to the flowering stem and up to thirty five small, green and reddish purple flowers. It is only known from the Brindabella Range where it grows in Eucalyptus forest.

== Description ==
Genoplesium ectopum is a terrestrial, perennial, deciduous, herb with an underground tuber and a single thin leaf 100–250 mm (4–10 in) and fused to the flowering stem, the free part 15–20 mm (0.6–0.8 in) long. Between fifteen and thirty five green and reddish purple flowers are arranged along a flowering stem reaching to a height of 20–40 mm (0.8–2 in) long and much taller than the leaf. The flowers are about 5 mm (0.2 in) long and wide and are inverted so that the labellum is above the column rather than below it. The dorsal sepal is 3–4 mm (0.1–0.2 in) long and about 2.5 mm (0.1 in) wide. The lateral sepals are 4–5 mm (0.16–0.20 in) long, about 1.5 mm (0.06 in) wide, with a humped base and spread apart from each other. The petals are about 3 mm (0.1 in) long and 1 mm (0.04 in) wide with a few hairs on their edges. The labellum is purple, about 4 mm (0.2 in) long, 2 mm (0.08 in) wide with coarse hairs up to 2 mm (0.08 in) long and the labellum vibrates in the slightest breeze. There is a callus in the centre of the labellum but not extending to its tip. Flowering occurs from January to March.

== Taxonomy and naming ==
Genoplesium ectopum was first formally described in 1999 by David Jones from a specimen collected in the Brindabella Ranges and the description was published in The Orchadian. In 2002, Jones and Mark Alwin Clements changed the name to Corunastylis ectopa. The specific epithet (ectopum) derived from the Ancient Greek word ektopos meaning "out of place".

== Distribution and habitat ==
The Brindabella midge orchid is only known from a single site in the Brindabella Range at an altitude of 980 m (3,000 ft) where it grows in Eucalyptus forest.

== Conservation ==
The entire population of this midge orchid grows within 10 m (30 ft) of a road embankment prone to erosion. Population estimates range from about 35 following bushfires and drought, to the present at about 110. The main threats to the species are erosion, roadworks, weed invasion, shrub growth and inappropriate use of herbicides. The species is listed as "critically endangered" (CR) under the Environment Protection and Biodiversity Conservation Act 1999 (EPBC Act).
