= Genoplesium tasmanicum =

Tasmanian midge orchid

Scientific classification
- Kingdom: Plantae
- Clade: Tracheophytes
- Clade: Angiosperms
- Clade: Monocots
- Order: Asparagales
- Family: Orchidaceae
- Subfamily: Orchidoideae
- Tribe: Diurideae
- Genus: Genoplesium
- Species: G. tasmanicum

Binomial name
- Genoplesium tasmanicum D.L.Jones

Synonyms
- Corunastylis tasmanica (D.L.Jones) D.L.Jones & M.A.Clem.

Species of orchid

Genoplesium tasmanicum, commonly known as the Tasmanian midge orchid, is a species of small terrestrial orchid that is endemic to Tasmania. It has a single thin leaf and up to twenty five dark purplish-black and green flowers. It is widespread and common at lower altitudes.

== Description ==
Genoplesium tasmanicum is a terrestrial, perennial, deciduous, herb with an underground tuber and a single thin leaf 80–180 mm (3–7 in) long with the free part 15–22 mm (0.6–0.9 in) long. Between three and twenty five dark purplish-black and green flowers are arranged along a flowering stem 10–30 mm (0.4–1 in) long, reaching to a height of 100–200 mm (4–8 in). The flowers lean downwards and are about 3.5 mm (0.1 in) wide. As with others in the genus, the flowers are inverted so that the labellum is above the column rather than below it. The dorsal sepal is lance-shaped to egg-shaped, 3–3.5 mm (0.12–0.14 in) long, about 2 mm (0.08 in) wide and greenish with darker bands. The lateral sepals are linear to lance-shaped, 4.5–5 mm (0.18–0.20 in) long, 1.5 mm (0.06 in) wide, greenish with a dark purplish base and separate from each other. The petals are egg-shaped, 2.5–3 mm (0.098–0.12 in) long, 1.5 mm (0.06 in) wide and dark purplish with a paler base. The labellum is egg-shaped to elliptic, fleshy, dark purplish-black, about 3 mm (0.1 in) long and 1.5 mm (0.06 in) wide with tiny bumps on its lower surface. There is a dark purplish-black callus in the centre of the labellum and extending nearly to its tip. Flowering occurs from January to April.

== Taxonomy and naming ==
The Tasmanian midge orchid was first formally described in 1991 by David Jones from a specimen collected near Kingston, and the description was published in Australian Orchid Research. In 2002, Jones and Mark Clements changed the name to Corunastylis tasmanica by the change is not accepted by the Australian Plant Census. The specific epithet (tasmanicum) is the Latinised version of "Tasmania".

== Distribution and habitat ==
Genoplesium tasmanicum is widespread and common in Tasmania where it mostly grows with herbs, shrubs or grasses at altitudes up to 250 m (800 ft).
