= Corunastylis =

Genus of orchids

Corunastylis is a historically recognized genus of about 50 species of orchids, native to Australia and New Zealand, now included in the genera Genoplesium and Prasophyllum.

In 1888, Robert Fitzgerald formally described Corunastylis apostasioides and published the description in Australian Orchids, the first time the name Corunastylis had been used. In 1889, Ferdinand von Mueller changed the name to Prasophyllum apostasioides and in 1989, David Jones and Mark Clements placed it and most other species of Prasophyllum into Genoplesium. In 2002 Jones and Clements moved all the species of Genoplesium back into Corunastylis except for the New South Wales species Genoplesium baueri.

A recent phylogenetic analysis of Prasophyllinae suggests that Corunastylis is paraphyletic, and funding from The Australian Orchid Foundation is supporting field work and molecular studies to improve understanding of the phylogeny of the subtribe.

Plants of the World Online considers Corunastylis to be a synonym of Genoplesium. All the species in the list below are now considered to be included in Genoplesium, except for Corunastylis obovata and Corunastylis unica, now included in the genus Prasophyllum as P. obovatum and P. unicum respectively.

The genus name Corunastylis is derived from Greek words meaning "a thick stick" and "a style".

The following is a list of species formerly included in Corunastylis:

- Corunastylis acuminata (R.S.Rogers) D.L.Jones & M.A.Clem. – pointed midge orchid
- Corunastylis alticola (D.L.Jones & B.Gray) D.L.Jones & M.A.Clem. – tableland midge orchid
- Corunastylis anthracina D.L.Jones – black midge orchid
- Corunastylis apostasioides Fitzg. – freak midge orchid
- Corunastylis archeri (Hook.f.) D.L.Jones & M.A.Clem. – elfin midge orchid
- Corunastylis arrecta D.L.Jones – erect midge orchid
- Corunastylis bishopii (D.L.Jones) D.L.Jones & M.A.Clem. – Gibraltar Range midge orchid
- Corunastylis brachystachya (Lindl.) D.L.Jones & M.A.Clem. – short spike midge orchid, Rocky Cape midge orchid
- Corunastylis capparina D.L.Jones
- Corunastylis carecta D.L.Jones & L.M.Copel.
- Corunastylis ciliata (Ewart & B.Rees) D.L.Jones & M.A.Clem. – fringed midge orchid
- Corunastylis citriodora (D.L.Jones & M.A.Clem.) D.L.Jones & M.A.Clem. - lemon scented midge orchid
- Corunastylis clivicola D.L.Jones (NSW, ACT)
- Corunastylis conferta (D.L.Jones) D.L.Jones & M.A.Clem. – crowded midge orchid
- Corunastylis cornuta D.L.Jones
- Corunastylis cranei (D.L.Jones) D.L.Jones & M.A.Clem. – Blackall Ridge midge orchid
- Corunastylis cuspidata D.L.Jones & L.M.Copel.
- Corunastylis densa (Fitzg.) D.L.Jones & M.A.Clem. – dense midge orchid
- Corunastylis despectans (Hook.f.) D.L.Jones & M.A.Clem. - sharp midge orchid
- Corunastylis ectopa (D.L.Jones) D.L.Jones & M.A.Clem. – Brindabella midge orchid
- Corunastylis eriochila (Fitzg.) D.L.Jones & M.A.Clem. – Mount Wilson midge orchid
- Corunastylis filiformis (Fitzg.) D.L.Jones & M.A.Clem. – glandular midge orchid
- Corunastylis fimbriata (R.Br.) D.L.Jones & M.A.Clem. - fringed midge orchid
- Corunastylis firthii (L.Cady) D.L.Jones – Firth's midge orchid
- Corunastylis formosa (D.L.Jones) D.L.Jones & M.A.Clem. – Cathcart midge orchid
- Corunastylis insignis (D.L.Jones) D.L.Jones & M.A.Clem. – dark midge orchid
- Corunastylis laminata (Fitzg.) D.L.Jones & M.A.Clem. – red midge orchid
- Corunastylis leptochila D.L.Jones
- Corunastylis littoralis (D.L.Jones) D.L.Jones & M.A.Clem. – Tuncurry midge orchid
- Corunastylis morina (D.L.Jones) D.L.Jones & M.A.Clem. – mulberry midge orchid
- Corunastylis morrisii (Nicholls) D.L.Jones & M.A.Clem. - bearded midge orchid
- Corunastylis mucronata (Rupp) D.L.Jones
- Corunastylis nigricans (R.Br.) D.L.Jones & M.A.Clem. - Kangaroo Island midge orchid
- Corunastylis nuda (Hook.f.) D.L.Jones & M.A.Clem. - tiny midge orchid
- Corunastylis nudiscapa (Hook.f.) D.L.Jones & M.A.Clem. - brownish midge orchid
- Corunastylis obovata (Rupp) D.L.Jones
- Corunastylis oligantha (D.L.Jones) D.L.Jones & M.A.Clem. – Mongarlowe midge orchid
- Corunastylis ostrina (D.L.Jones) D.L.Jones & M.A.Clem. – purple midge orchid
- Corunastylis parvicalla (Rupp) D.L.Jones & M.A.Clem. – mountain-top midge orchid
- Corunastylis pedersonii (D.L.Jones) D.L.Jones & M.A.Clem. – Pederson's midge orchid
- Corunastylis plumosa (Rupp) D.L.Jones & M.A.Clem. - Tallong midge orchid
- Corunastylis psammophila (D.L.Jones) D.L.Jones & M.A.Clem. – coastal midge orchid
- Corunastylis pumila (Hook.f.) D.L.Jones & M.A.Clem. - green midge orchid
- Corunastylis rhyolitica (D.L.Jones & M.A.Clem.) D.L.Jones & M.A.Clem. – Pambula midge orchid
- Corunastylis rufa (R.Br.) D.L.Jones & M.A.Clem. - rufous midge orchid
- Corunastylis ruppii (R.S.Rogers) D.L.Jones & M.A.Clem. – Rupp's midge orchid
- Corunastylis sagittifera (Rupp) D.L.Jones & M.A.Clem. – horned midge orchid
- Corunastylis sigmoidea (D.L.Jones) D.L.Jones & M.A.Clem. – Dave's Creek midge orchid
- Corunastylis simulans (D.L.Jones) D.L.Jones & M.A.Clem. – Blue Mountains midge orchid
- Corunastylis stephensonii D.L.Jones
- Corunastylis superba (D.L.Jones) D.L.Jones & M.A.Clem. – pink midge orchid
- Corunastylis systena (D.L.Jones) D.L.Jones & M.A.Clem. – Kangarooby midge orchid
- Corunastylis tasmanica (D.L.Jones) D.L.Jones & M.A.Clem. – Tasmanian midge orchid
- Corunastylis tecta (D.L.Jones) D.L.Jones & M.A.Clem. – Cardwell midge orchid
- Corunastylis tenella D.L.Jones & L.M.Copel.
- Corunastylis tepperi (F.Muell. ex Tepper) D.L.Jones & M.A.Clem. – mallee midge orchid
- Corunastylis trifida (Rupp) D.L.Jones & L.M.Copel. – blackish midge orchid
- Corunastylis turfosa (D.L.Jones) D.L.Jones & M.A.Clem. – alpine midge orchid
- Corunastylis unica (Rupp) D.L.Jones
- Corunastylis valida (D.L.Jones) D.L.Jones & M.A.Clem. – Blackdown midge orchid
- Corunastylis vernalis (D.L.Jones) D.L.Jones & M.A.Clem. – spring midge orchid
- Corunastylis woollsii (F.Muell.) D.L.Jones & M.A.Clem. – dark midge orchid
