= C. nigricans =

C. nigricans may refer to:

- Caecilia nigricans, an amphibian species found in Colombia, Ecuador and Panama
- Calyptranthes nigricans, DC., a plant species in the genus Calyptranthes
- Camponotus nigricans, Roger, 1863, an ant species in the genus Camponotus
- Carex nigricans, a species of sedge
- Celaenorrhinus nigricans, the small banded flat, a butterfly species found in South and Southeast Asia
- Cercomacra nigricans, the jet antbird, a bird species found in Brazil, Colombia, Ecuador, Panama and Venezuela
- Chalcosyrphus nigricans, Shiraki, 1968, an hoverfly species in the genus Chalcosyrphus
- Chinemys nigricans, the red-necked pond turtle, a turtle species endemic to China
- Clanculus nigricans, a sea snail species in the genus Clanculus
- Clarias nigricans, a catfish species only known from the Mahakam River in eastern Borneo
- Claviceps nigricans a species of Ergot fungi
- Corunastylis nigricans, (R.Br.) D.L.Jones & M.A.Clem., the Mallee midge-orchid, a plant species in the genus Corunastylis
- Creugas nigricans, C. L. Koch, 1841, a spider species in the genus Creugas and the family Corinnidae found in Mexico and Colombia
- Crocidura nigricans, the blackish white-toothed shrew, a mammal species endemic to Angola
- Cyathea nigricans, a tree fern species in the genus Cyathea
- Cyerce nigricans, a sacoglossan sea slug species

== See also ==
- Nigricans (disambiguation)
