= Diuris striata =

Scientific classification
- Kingdom: Plantae
- Clade: Tracheophytes
- Clade: Angiosperms
- Clade: Monocots
- Order: Asparagales
- Family: Orchidaceae
- Subfamily: Orchidoideae
- Tribe: Diurideae
- Genus: Diuris
- Species: D. striata

Binomial name
- Diuris striata Rupp

Species of orchid

Diuris striata is a poorly-known species of orchid that is endemic to New South Wales. It has a two grass-like leaves and about four mauve flowers with dark purple streaks on the labellum.

== Description ==
Diuris striata is a tuberous, perennial herb with a two linear leaves 80–120 mm (3–5 in) long, about 4 mm (0.2 in) wide and folded lengthwise. About four mauve flowers about 20 mm (0.8 in) wide are borne on a flowering stem about 220 mm (9 in) tall. The dorsal sepal is erect, 7–9 mm (0.3–0.4 in) long, 3–6 mm (0.1–0.2 in) wide and egg-shaped. The lateral sepals are linear, about 15 mm (0.6 in) long and turned downwards. The petals spread apart from each other, egg-shaped to more or less lance-shaped, about 7 mm (0.3 in) long and 5 mm (0.2 in) wide. The labellum is about 9 mm (0.4 in) long and has three lobes. The centre lobe is egg-shaped to heart-shaped and 6 mm (0.24 in) wide with dark purple streaks. The side lobes are linear to egg-shaped with the narrower end towards the base, about 2.5 mm (0.1 in) long and 1 mm (0.04 in) wide. There are two callus ridges about 5 mm (0.2 in) long near the mid-line of the labellum. Flowering has only been observed in November.

== Taxonomy and naming ==
Diuris striata was first formally described in 1944 by Herman Rupp and the description was published in his book The Orchids of New South Wales. Rupp noted "No specimens are known and the following brief description is quoted from Moore and Betche's Handbook: [Handbook of the flora of New South Wales : a description of the flowering plants and ferns indigenous to New South Wales] "Flowers lilac. Lateral sepals under 1 in (30 mm) long, the dorsal one rather longer than the labellum. Petals ovate-lanceolate. Lateral lobes of the labellum short, acute, recurved, the middle lobe broadly spathulate. Flowers not blotched, but the labellum barred with darker lines". The specific epithet (striata) is derived from the Latin word meaning stria meaning "furrow", "channel" or "stripe".

== Distribution ==
This orchid is only known from the type collection made near Forbes before 1889.
