= Dodonaea tepperi =

Scientific classification
- Kingdom: Plantae
- Clade: Tracheophytes
- Clade: Angiosperms
- Clade: Eudicots
- Clade: Rosids
- Order: Sapindales
- Family: Sapindaceae
- Genus: Dodonaea
- Species: D. tepperi

Binomial name
- Dodonaea tepperi F.Muell. ex Tepper

Species of shrub

Dodonaea tepperi is a species of flowering plant in the family Sapindaceae and is endemic to South Australia. It is a spreading shrub with simple linear, oblong or narrowly elliptic leaves with the edges rolled under, flowers arranged singly with 3 or 4 egg-shaped sepals, 6 to 8 stamens and capsules with three or four crust-like wings.

== Description ==
Dodonaea tepperi is a spreading dioecious or rarely polygamodioecious shrub that typically grows to a height of up to 60 cm (24 in). Its leaves are simple, linear, oblong or narrowly elliptic, 8–14 mm (0.31–0.55 in) long, 1–3 mm (0.039–0.118 in) wide and glabrous, with the edges rolled under. The flowers are borne singly on a pedicel 1–2.6 mm (0.039–0.102 in) long, with 3 or 4 egg-shaped sepals 1.8–3.3 mm (0.071–0.130 in) long, 6 to 8 stamens, and a glabrous ovary. The fruit is a 3- or 4-winged, more or less spherical or broadly egg-shaped capsule 4–5 mm (0.16–0.20 in) long and 5.0–5.5 mm (0.20–0.22 in) wide, the wings often absent or lobe-like, up to 0.5 mm (0.020 in) wide and crust-like.

== Taxonomy ==
Dodonaea tepperi was first formally described in 1880 by Johann Gottlieb Otto Tepper from an unpublished description by Ferdinand von Mueller and the description was published in Transactions, Proceedings and Report, Royal Society of South Australia from specimens found on a stony hillside near Androssan on the Yorke Peninsula.

== Distribution and habitat ==
This species of hop-bush is a very rare species and is only known from a few disjunct populations in semi-arid mallee areas of South Australia. It was collected in the 1900s in the Gawler Ranges, and on the Fleurieu, Yorke and Eyre Peninsulas.
