= Prasophyllum unicum =

Scientific classification
- Kingdom: Plantae
- Clade: Tracheophytes
- Clade: Angiosperms
- Clade: Monocots
- Order: Asparagales
- Family: Orchidaceae
- Subfamily: Orchidoideae
- Tribe: Diurideae
- Genus: Prasophyllum
- Species: P. unicum

Binomial name
- Prasophyllum unicum Rupp

Synonyms
- Corunastylis unica (Rupp) D.L.Jones

Species of orchid

Prasophyllum unicum is a species of terrestrial orchid that is endemic to New South Wales. It has a single leaf fused to the flowering stem and between two and fifteen flowers with a dark reddish labellum.

== Description ==
Prasophyllum unicum is a terrestrial, perennial, deciduous, herb with an underground tuber and a single leaf sheathing the flowering stem at the base. Between two and fifteen flowers are arranged on a flowering stem 100–130 mm (3.9–5.1 in) high. The flowers are inverted so that the labellum is above the column rather than below it. The dorsal sepal is about 3 mm (0.12 in) long and oblong, narrowing to a long, thread-like tip, and barely forming a hood over the column. The lateral sepals are lance-shaped, about 5 mm (0.20 in) long and swollen at the base. The petals are narrow, shorter than the dorsal sepal with a fine, thread-like tip. The labellum is spatula-shaped with a thread-like tip, and a two thick, parallel, dark reddish calli.

== Taxonomy and naming ==
Prasophyllum unicum was first formally described in 1942 by Herman Montague Rupp in The Victorian Naturalist from specimens collected in Normanhurst in the same year. The name is accepted at Plants of the World Online but is considered a synonym of Corunastylis rufa at the Australian Plant Census. The specific epithet (unica) means "unique", "because it stands alone among all forms hitherto described".

== Distribution and habitat ==
Prasophyllum unicum occurs in New South Wales.
