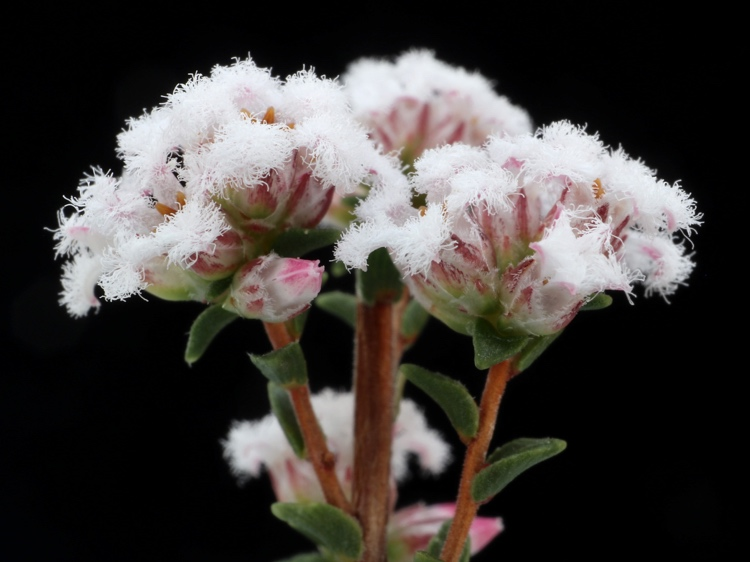
- In the Australian National Botanic Gardens

Scientific classification
- Kingdom: Plantae
- Clade: Tracheophytes
- Clade: Angiosperms
- Clade: Eudicots
- Clade: Asterids
- Order: Ericales
- Family: Ericaceae
- Genus: Leucopogon
- Species: L. costatus

Binomial name
- Leucopogon costatus Lindl.
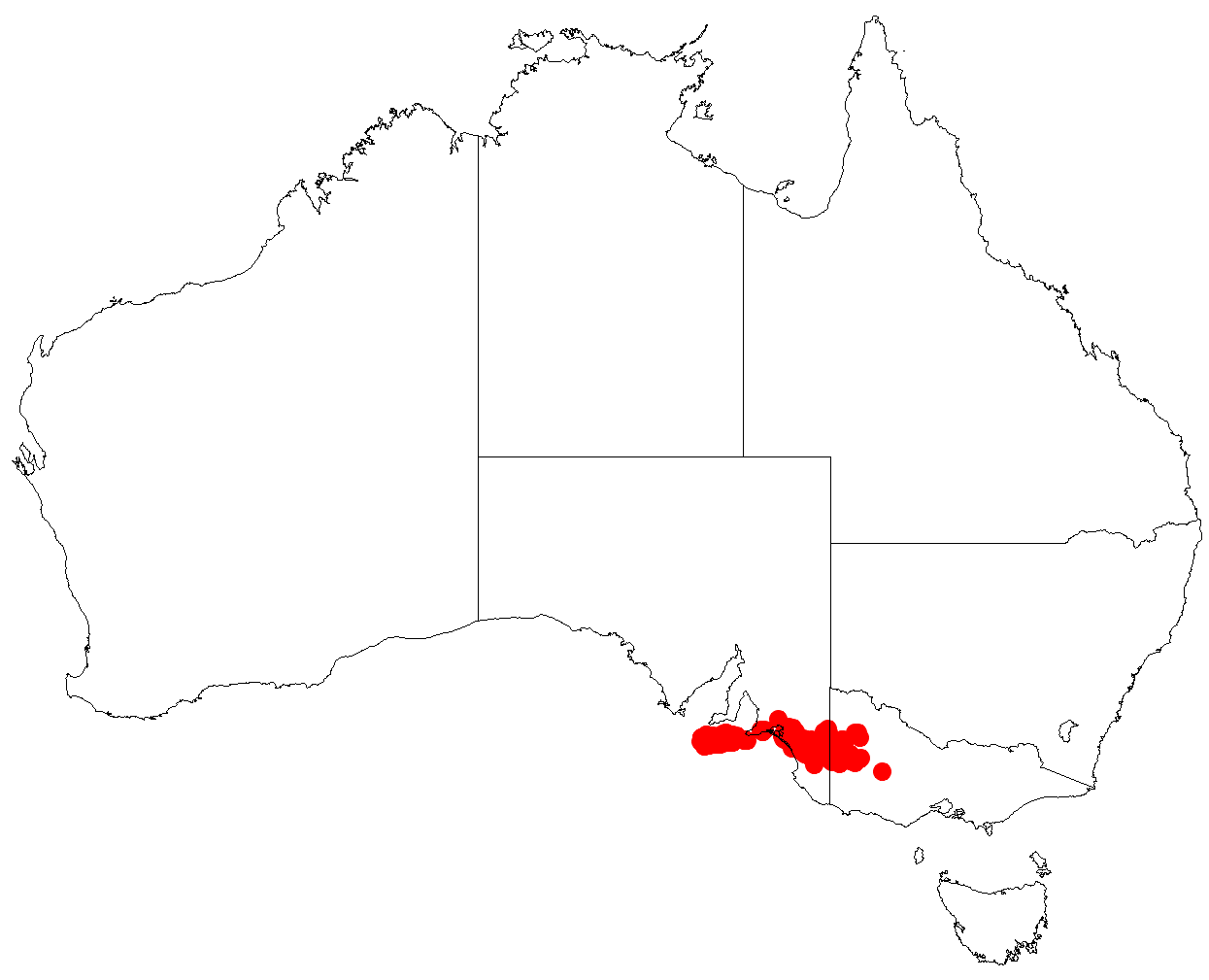
- Occurrence data from AVH

Synonyms
- Styphelia costata F.Muell.

= Leucopogon costatus =

Species of plant

Leucopogon costatus, commonly known as twiggy beard-heath, is a species of flowering plant in the heath family Ericaceae and is endemic to southern continental Australia. It is an erect or straggling shrub with broadly egg-shaped, stem-clasping leaves, and white, tube-shaped flowers, the petals densely bearded on the inside.

== Description ==
Leucopogon costatus is a slender, erect or straggling erect shrub that typically grows to a height of up to 50 cm (20 in) and has softly-hairy young branchlets. Its leaves are broadly egg-shaped, 1.5–5 mm (0.059–0.197 in) long and 1.0–3.5 mm (0.039–0.138 in) wide with a stem-clasping base. The flowers are arranged in spikes of up to four 4–7 mm (0.16–0.28 in) long in leaf axils or on the ends of branches, with egg-shaped bracteoles 1.0–1.3 mm (0.039–0.051 in) long at the base. The sepals are egg-shaped, 1.6–2.3 mm (0.063–0.091 in) long, the petals white and joined at the base to form a cylindrical or bell-shaped tube 1.1–1.5 mm (0.043–0.059 in) long, the lobes 1.2–1.8 mm (0.047–0.071 in) long and densely bearded on the inside.

== Taxonomy ==
Twiggy beard-heath was first formally described in 1885 by Ferdinand von Mueller who gave it the name Styphelia costata in Southern Science Record from specimens collected by Otto Tepper on Kangaroo Island. In 1918, John McConnell Black changed the name to Leucopogon costatus in the Transactions and Proceedings of the Royal Society of South Australia. The specific epithet (costatus) means "ribbed".

== Distribution and habitat ==
Leucopogon costatus grows mallee, scrub and heathland in the Little Desert National Park and southern Big Desert regions of Victoria and in the south-east of South Australia, including Kangaroo Island.
