= Genoplesium mucronatum =

Scientific classification
- Kingdom: Plantae
- Clade: Tracheophytes
- Clade: Angiosperms
- Clade: Monocots
- Order: Asparagales
- Family: Orchidaceae
- Subfamily: Orchidoideae
- Tribe: Diurideae
- Genus: Genoplesium
- Species: G. mucronatum

Binomial name
- Genoplesium mucronatum (Rupp) M.A.M.Renner

Synonyms
- Corunastylis mucronata (Rupp) D.L.Jones; Prasophyllum mucronatum Rupp

Species of orchid

Genoplesium mucronatum is a species of small terrestrial orchid endemic to eastern New South Wales. It has a single leaf fused to the flowering stem and between six and twelve green and reddish-purple flowers.

== Description ==
Genoplesium mucronatum is a terrestrial, perennial, deciduous, herb with an underground tuber and a single leaf sheathing the flowering stem. Between six and twelve green and reddish-purple flowers are arranged along a flowering stem up to 120 mm (4.7 in) high. The flowers are inverted so that the labellum is above the column rather than below it. The dorsal sepal forms a hood over the column and is about 2 mm (0.079 in) long, the lateral sepals are linear, about 3 mm (0.12 in) long and spread widely apart with a club-shaped gland at the tip and swollen at the base. The petals are triangular to lance-shaped, scarcely 2 mm (0.079 in) long with a pointed or tapering tip. The labellum is about 3 mm (0.12 in) long with a winged column.

== Taxonomy and naming ==
This species of orchid was first formally described in 1948 by Herman Montague Rupp, who gave it the name Prasophyllum mucronatum in The Victorian Naturalist from specimens collected at Woodford in the same year. In 2022, Matthew Renner changed the name to Genoplesium mucronatum in the journal Telopea and the name is accepted by Plants of the World Online. The name (as Prasophyllum mucronatum or Corunastylis mucronatum) is listed as a synonym of Genoplesium rufum at the National Herbarium of New South Wales and the Australian Plant Name Index.

== Distribution and habitat ==
Genoplesium mucronatum occurs in eastern New South Wales.
