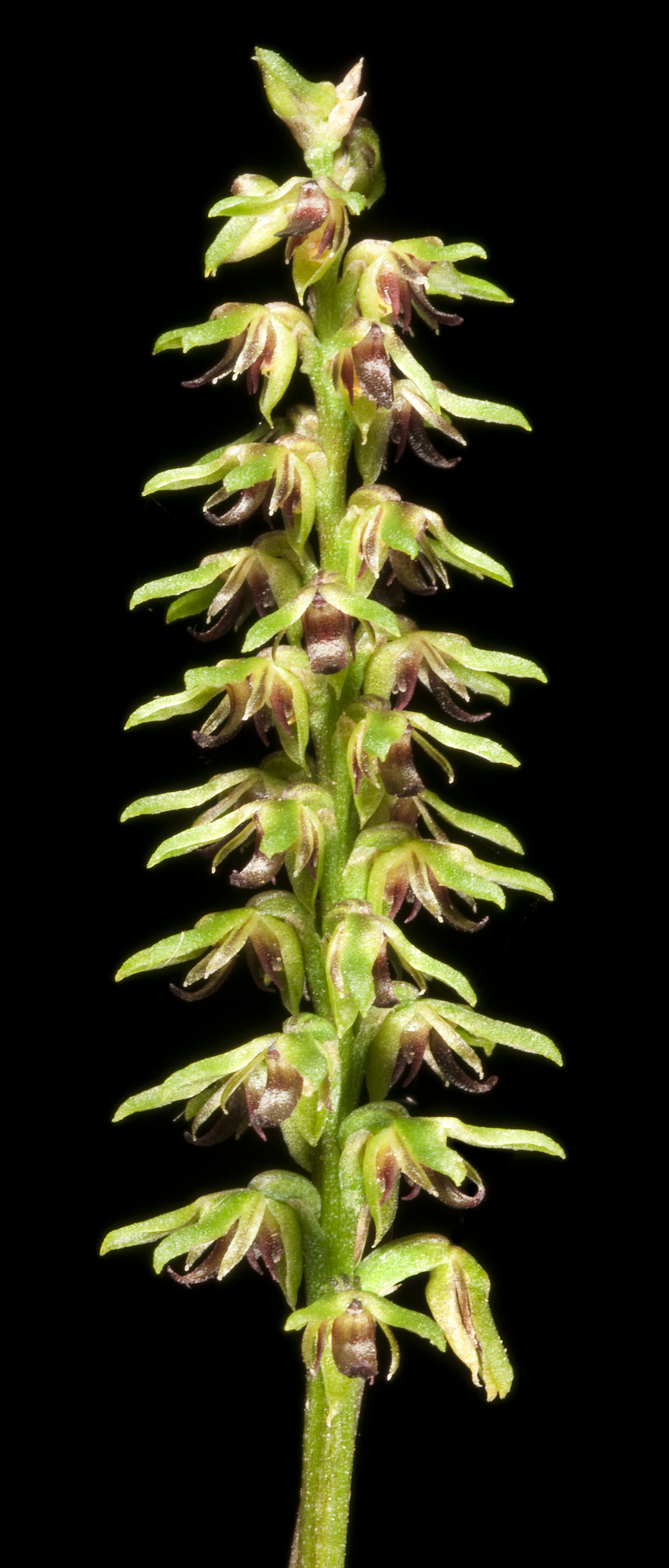

Scientific classification
- Kingdom: Plantae
- Clade: Tracheophytes
- Clade: Angiosperms
- Clade: Monocots
- Order: Asparagales
- Family: Orchidaceae
- Subfamily: Orchidoideae
- Tribe: Diurideae
- Genus: Genoplesium
- Species: G. nigricans

Binomial name
- Genoplesium nigricans (R.Br.) D.L.Jones & M.A.Clem.

Synonyms
- Corunastylis nigricans (R.Br.) D.L.Jones & M.A.Clem.; Prasophyllum nigricans R.Br.; Corunastylis fuscoviridis (Reader) D.L.Jones & M.A.Clem.; Corunastylis tepperi (F.Muell. ex Tepper) D.L.Jones & M.A.Clem.; Prasophyllum fuscoviride Reader; Prasophyllum horburyanum Rupp; Prasophyllum tepperi F.Muell. ex Tepper

= Genoplesium nigricans =

Mallee midge orchid

Species of orchid

Genoplesium nigricans is a species of flowering plant in the orchid family. In Australia, it is given the scientific name Corunastylis tepperi, commonly known as mallee midge orchid in Victoria and as pigmy orchid in Western Australia, but is still known as Genoplesium nigricans in New South Wales and South Australia. It is a terrestrial herb with a single leaf mostly surrounding the stem, and up to 50 tiny greenish flowers with a deep maroon-coloured labellum and often have a fruity fragrance.

== Description ==
Genoplesium nigricans is a terrestrial, perennial, deciduous herb. A single long leaf surrounds the stem from the base of the plant to the lowest of the flowers. The leaf is 80–250 mm (3.1–9.8 in) long and 1–2 mm (0.039–0.079 in) wide.

The inflorescence is a spike with from 5 to 50 crowded, tiny, non-resupinate flowers which are bright green with a dark maroon-coloured to purplish-black labellum. Each flower is pendulous, about 3 mm (0.12 in) wide and long with petals and sepals that do not spread widely. The dorsal sepal is a broad egg-shape, about 2 mm (0.079 in) long and wide. The two lateral sepals are lance-shaped, 2.5–3.5 mm (0.098–0.138 in) long and about 1 mm (0.039 in) wide and dished near their bases. The petals are linear, tipped with small glands about 2 mm (0.079 in) long and less than 1 mm (0.039 in) wide. The dark-coloured labellum is egg-shaped, about the same size as the petals with a minutely wavy edge. The callus is narrow egg-shaped and extends almost to the tip of the labellum. The column, which is below the labellum has wings with a rough surface. Flowering occurs between February and May and the fruit that follows is a non-fleshy, dehiscent capsule containing hundreds of seeds.

== Taxonomy and naming ==
The lectotype includes the 1802 specimen collected by Brown and the 1907 drawing by Smith.

This taxon was first formally described in 1810 by Robert Brown, who gave it the name Prasophyllum nigricans in his Prodromus Florae Novae Hollandiae et Insulae Van Diemen with observations by Ferdinand Bauer, from specimens collected on Bay X (Port Lincoln) between 26 February and 6 March 1802. In 1989, David Jones and Mark Clements transferred Prasophyllum nigricans to Genoplesium as G. nigricans in the journal Lindleyana. The specific epithet (nigricans) is a Latin word meaning 'blackish'.

In 1880, Otto Tepper, a naturalist, geologist, physicist, conservationist, orchidologist and South Australian school teacher, reported to the Royal Society of South Australia, the discovery he had made of an orchid "in respect of which Baron F. v. Mueller, has done me the honour of naming it Prasophyllum Tepperi". Tepper's description was formalised by Ferdinand von Mueller in 1882 with the name published in Systematic Census of Australian Plants.

In 1898, Felix Reader published the name Prasophyllum fuscoviride for a plant collected in Lowan in Dimboola shire by "Miss Felice Reader". Carl Walter later found this species farther north. The description was published in The Victorian Naturalist. The specific epithet (fuscoviride) means 'dark green'.

In 1942, Herman Rupp published the name Prasophyllum horburyanum for a plant collected in May 1938 by L. Horbury in Western Australia from 'Kumarl, via Esperance', the name being published in the Victorian Naturalist. In 1971, P. horburyanum was recognised by Alex George as a synonym of P. fuscoviride.

Richard Sanders Rogers highlighted the differences in the botanical descriptions of P. nigricans that existed in 1909 in Transactions of the Royal Society of South Australia in which he published descriptions of both P. nigricans and P. tepperi, with P. tepperi being characterised by stalked glands on the tips of the petals and the labellum with a blunt apex. His concept of P. nigricans never had glands on petals, the labellum was pointed and occurred near Belair in the hills near Adelaide. Rogers referred to the drawings of the type specimen of P. nigricans (numbered 5551), which were drawn by Matilda Smith on 11 June 1907, only two years earlier, but 105 years after the collection by Robert Brown, noting that glands were absent on this specimen.

In 1922, in the first edition of Flora of South Australia by John McConnell Black, Rogers described both P. fuscoviride and P. nigricans. He then regarded P. fuscoviride to be confined to Yorke Peninsula in South Australia. Rogers died in 1942 but in the second edition of Black's Flora in 1943, the range of P. fuscoviride included a much larger area including both Victoria and Western Australia.

The third edition of Flora of South Australia by John McConnell Black was published in 1978, after the death of Black in 1951. The section on Orchidaceae was authored by Joseph Zvando Weber and Robert John Bates. Regarding P. nigricans, they stated, "Black (1943) called this species P. fuscoviride; his P. nigricans is P. rufum."

In 1989, David Jones and Mark Clements designated the lectotype for P. nigricans as specimen (a) from South Coast, Bay X [Port Lincoln, South Australia], collected on 3 March 1802. Elspeth Haston has written a summary of the history of the specimens collected by Robert Brown in Australia from 1801 to 1805, the transfer of specimens to J.J. Bennett, his successor, after is death in 1858, and the distribution with blue labels after the death of Bennett in 1876.

In 2002, David Jones and Mark Clements transferred Prasophyllum tepperi to Corunastylis as C. tepperi. Plants of the World Online lists C. tepperi as a synonym of Genoplesium nigricans. The Australian Plant Census and the Royal Botanic Gardens Victoria accept the name C. tepperi.

In 2018, David Jones and Mark Clements proposed a new infrageneric classification of the genus in Australian Orchid Review., and in 2019 the name C. tepperi was changed to Corunastylis fuscoviridis in the journal Nuytsia. The name Corunastylis fuscoviridis is accepted by the Western Australian Herbarium. However, Plants of the World Online list Corunastylis tepperi and Corunastylis fuscoviridis as heterotypic synonyms of Genoplesium nigricans, and this is supported the State Herbarium of South Australia (AD) in the Census of South Australian Plants.

== Distribution and habitat ==
Mallee midge orchid occurs in arid areas, mostly in mallee shrubland and Callitris woodland. It is found in isolated populations across South Australia including the Eyre Peninsula where it was initially collected, and in north-western Victoria. Further populations are found in Western Australia where mallee plants are abundant, in the Avon Wheatbelt, Coolgardie, Esperance Plains, Hampton and Mallee biogeographic regions.

== Ecology ==
This species appears to be pollinated by tiny fruit flies which are attracted by the scent of the flower at the same time as other plants, such as Leucopogon are flowering.
