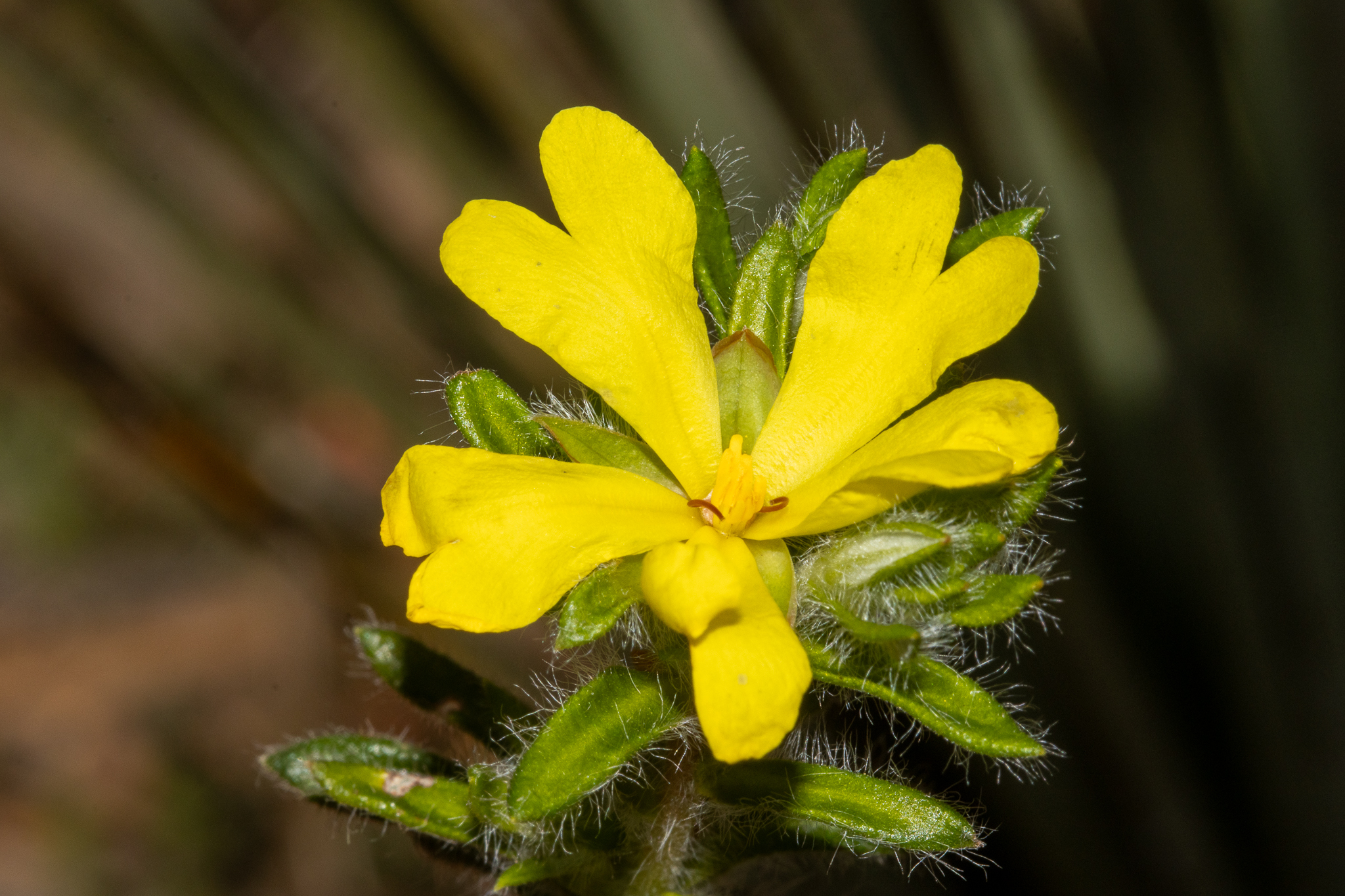
- Near Western River on Kangaroo Island

Scientific classification
- Kingdom: Plantae
- Clade: Embryophytes
- Clade: Tracheophytes
- Clade: Spermatophytes
- Clade: Angiosperms
- Clade: Eudicots
- Order: Dilleniales
- Family: Dilleniaceae
- Genus: Hibbertia
- Species: H. villifera

Binomial name
- Hibbertia villifera Tepper ex Toelken

= Hibbertia villifera =

Species of flowering plant

Hibbertia villifera is a species of flowering plant in the family Dilleniaceae and is endemic to South Australia. It is a shrub with rigid, woody branches, hairy foliage, linear to elliptic leaves and yellow flowers with seven to eleven stamens on one side of two hairy carpels.

== Description ==
Hibbertia villifera is shrub that typically grows to a height of 20–60 cm (7.9–23.6 in) and has rigid, woody branches and hairy foliage. The leaves are linear to elliptic, mostly 9–14 mm (0.35–0.55 in) long and 2.1–3.0 mm (0.083–0.118 in) wide on a petiole 0.3–1.1 mm (0.012–0.043 in) long. The flowers are sessile and arranged in groups of three to five on the ends of branches with linear to lance-shaped bracts 3.3–4.5 mm (0.13–0.18 in) long at the base. The five sepals are joined at the base, the outer lobes 4.8–5.5 mm (0.19–0.22 in) long and 2.2–2.6 mm (0.087–0.102 in) wide, the inner lobes slightly broader. The petals are yellow, egg-shaped with the narrower end towards the wedge-shaped base, 5.6–11.3 mm (0.22–0.44 in) long with seven to eleven stamens fused at the base on one side of two carpels, each carpel with two hairy ovules. Flowering occurs from September to November.

== Taxonomy ==
The first specimens of this species were collected in 1886 by Johann Tepper near Karatta on Kangaroo Island. Tepper labelled the specimens Hibbertia villifera. The species was first formally described in 2000 by Hellmut R. Toelken in the Journal of the Adelaide Botanic Gardens from specimens he collected near Vivonne Bay on Kangaroo Island in 1997. The specific epithet (villifera) means "bearing long, weak hairs".

== Distribution and habitat ==
This hibbertia grows in heath or mallee on Kangaroo Island and the southern Mount Lofty Ranges.

== See also ==
- List of Hibbertia species
