= Prasophyllum obovatum =

Scientific classification
- Kingdom: Plantae
- Clade: Tracheophytes
- Clade: Angiosperms
- Clade: Monocots
- Order: Asparagales
- Family: Orchidaceae
- Subfamily: Orchidoideae
- Tribe: Diurideae
- Genus: Prasophyllum
- Species: P. obovatum

Binomial name
- Prasophyllum obovatum Rupp

Synonyms
- Corunastylis obovata (Rupp) D.L.Jones

Species of orchid

Prasophyllum obovatum is a species of small terrestrial orchid endemic to New South Wales. It has a single leaf fused to the flowering stem and a few reddish-purple flowers with translucent patches.

== Description ==
Prasophyllum obovatum is a terrestrial, perennial, deciduous, herb with an underground tuber and a single leaf sheathing the flowering stem at the base. A few reddish-purple flowers with translucent patches are arranged along a flowering stem up to 150 mm (5.9 in) high. The flowers are inverted so that the labellum is above the column rather than below it. The dorsal sepal and is broadly egg-shaped, about 2 mm (0.079 in) long, and forms a hood over the column. The lateral sepals are lance-shaped, about 3 mm (0.12 in) long, deeply concave with a tiny, down-curved point on the tip. The petals are broad and curved with two tiny points at the tip, one with a small gland. The labellum is egg-shaped with the narrower end towards the base, about 3 mm (0.12 in) long with a winged column.

== Taxonomy and naming ==
Prasophyllum obovatum was first formally described in 1948 by Herman Montague Rupp in The Victorian Naturalist from specimens collected at Heathcote in the same year. The name is accepted at Plants of the World Online but is considered a synonym of Corunastylis rufa at the Australian Plant Census.

== Distribution and habitat ==
Prasophyllum obovatum occurs in New South Wales.
