= Corunastylis densa =

Dense midge orchid

Scientific classification
- Kingdom: Plantae
- Clade: Tracheophytes
- Clade: Angiosperms
- Clade: Monocots
- Order: Asparagales
- Family: Orchidaceae
- Subfamily: Orchidoideae
- Tribe: Diurideae
- Genus: Corunastylis
- Species: C. densa

Binomial name
- Corunastylis densa (Fitzg.) D.L.Jones & M.A.Clem.

Synonyms
- List: Corunastylis albiglans (Rupp) D.L.Jones & M.A.Clem.; Corunastylis ansata (Fitzg.) D.L.Jones & M.A.Clem.; Corunastylis longisepala (Fitzg.) D.L.Jones & M.A.Clem.; Corunastylis nichollsiana (Rupp) D.L.Jones & M.A.Clem.; Genoplesium sp. Densum (M.A.Clements 1748) Australian National Herbarium; Prasophyllum albiglans Rupp; Prasophyllum ansatum Fitzg.; Prasophyllum densiflorum E.Coleman nom. inval., nom. prov.; Prasophyllum densiflorum Nubl. nom. inval.; Prasophyllum densiflorum M.A.Clem. nom. inval., pro syn.; Prasophyllum densiflorum D.L.Jones & M.A.Clem. nom. inval., pro syn.; Prasophyllum densiflorum D.L.Jones nom. inval., pro syn.; Prasophyllum densum Fitzg.; Prasophyllum iensoflorum Nubl. nom. inval., nom. nud.; Prasophyllum longisepalum Fitzg.; Prasophyllum nichollsianum Rupp

Species of orchid

Corunastylis densa, commonly known as dense midge orchid, is a small terrestrial orchid endemic to eastern Australia. It has a single thin leaf fused to the flowering stem and up to twenty five densely crowded reddish-brown to dark purplish-brown flowers. It is found between the New England National Park and the Moroka River.

== Description ==
Corunastylis densa is a terrestrial, perennial, deciduous, herb with an underground tuber and a single thin leaf 60–80 mm (2–3 in) long and fused to the flowering stem with the free part 6–12 mm (0.2–0.5 in) long. Between five and twenty five reddish-brown to dark purplish-brown flowers are densely crowded along a flowering stem 8–15 mm (0.3–0.6 in) long. The flowers lean downwards and are about 5 mm (0.20 in) long and 3.5 mm (0.14 in) wide. As with others in the genus, the flowers are inverted so that the labellum is above the column rather than below it. The dorsal sepal is about 2.5 mm (0.1 in) long and 1.5 mm (0.06 in) wide with hairless edges and a sharply pointed tip. The lateral sepals are about 4.5 mm (0.2 in) long, 1 mm (0.04 in) wide, turn downwards, spread widely apart from each other and have a small, white gland on the tip. The petals are about 2.5 mm (0.1 in) long, 1 mm (0.04 in) wide and also have a white gland on their tip. The labellum is elliptic to egg-shaped with the narrower end towards the base, about 2 mm (0.08 in) long and 1 mm (0.04 in) wide, thick and fleshy. There is a callus in the centre of the labellum and extending nearly to its tip. Flowering occurs from December to February.

== Taxonomy and naming ==
Dense midge orchid was first formally described in 1885 by Robert D. FitzGerald who gave it the name Prasophyllum densum and published the description in Journal of Botany, British and Foreign. In 2005, David Jones and Mark Clements changed the name to Corunastylis densa. The specific epithet (densa) is a Latin word meaning "thick" or "close".

The World Checklist of Selected Plant Families lists C. densa as a synonym of Genoplesium nudiscapum.

== Distribution and habitat ==
Corunastylis densa grows in a range of habitats between Point Lookout in New South Wales and the Moroka River in Victoria but is absent from the Snowy Mountains and the Australian Capital Territory.
