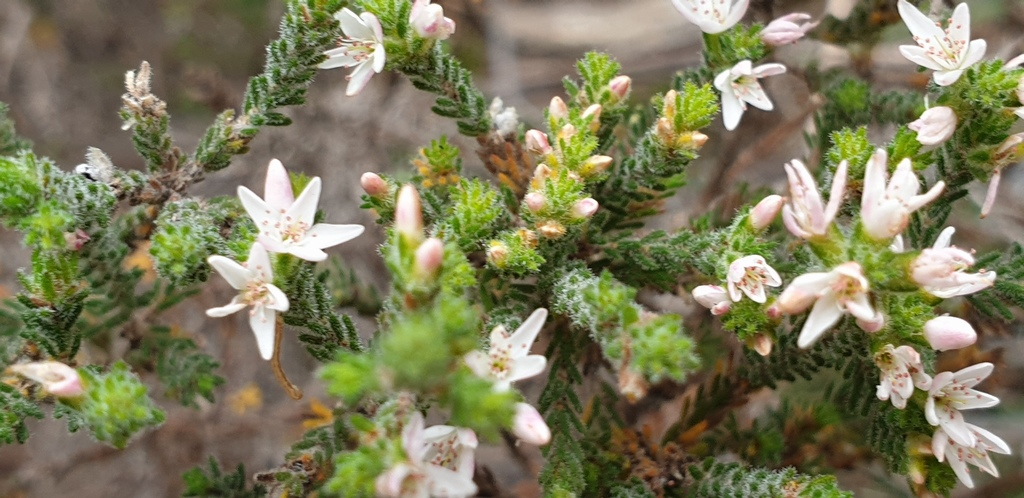
- In Flinders Chase National Park

Scientific classification
- Kingdom: Plantae
- Clade: Tracheophytes
- Clade: Angiosperms
- Clade: Eudicots
- Clade: Rosids
- Order: Myrtales
- Family: Myrtaceae
- Genus: Calytrix
- Species: C. smeatoniana

Binomial name
- Calytrix smeatoniana (F.Muell.) Craven

Synonyms
- Lhotskya smeatoniana F.Muell.; Lhotzkya smeatoniana F.Muell. orth. var.

= Calytrix smeatoniana =

Species of flowering plant

Calytrix smeatoniana is a species of flowering plant in the myrtle family Myrtaceae and is endemic to Kangaroo Island in South Australia. It is a shrub with hairy branchlets, linear to narrowly elliptic leaves and white to pale pink flowers with about 18 to 22 stamens in a single row.

== Description ==
Calytrix smeatoniana is a shrub that typically grows to a height of 1 m (3 ft 3 in) and has branchlets covered with soft hairs. Its leaves are linear to narrowly elliptic, 1.5–3.75 mm (0.059–0.148 in) long and 0.30–0.75 mm (0.012–0.030 in) wide on a petiole 0.30–0.75 mm (0.012–0.030 in) long, with stipules up to 0.25 mm (0.0098 in) long at the base of the petiole. The flowers are on a peduncle 0.3–1 mm (0.012–0.039 in) long. The floral tube is spindle-shaped, 2–3 mm (0.079–0.118 in) long and has ten ribs. The sepals are narrowly elliptic or reduced to an irregular rim at the base of the floral tube, 2–3 mm (0.079–0.118 in) long, and lack an awn. The petals are white to pale pink and there are about 18 to 22 stamens with white filaments in a single row. Flowering occurs between August and December.

== Taxonomy ==
This species was first formally described in 1887 by Ferdinand von Mueller who gave it the name Lhotskya smeatoniana in The Australasian Journal of Pharmacy from specimens collected by Otto Tepper on Kangaroo Island. In 1987, Lyndley Craven transferred the species to Calytrix as C. smeatoniana in the journal Brunonia. The specific epithet (smeatoniana) honours Thomas Smeaton, a member of the Royal Society of South Australia and who has "much promoted the natural sciences in the neighbouring colony".

== Distribution and habitat ==
Calytrix smeatoniana grows in heath in the western half of Kangaroo Island.
