= Genoplesium simulans =

Blue Mountains midge orchid

Scientific classification
- Kingdom: Plantae
- Clade: Tracheophytes
- Clade: Angiosperms
- Clade: Monocots
- Order: Asparagales
- Family: Orchidaceae
- Subfamily: Orchidoideae
- Tribe: Diurideae
- Genus: Genoplesium
- Species: G. simulans

Binomial name
- Genoplesium simulans D.L.Jones

Synonyms
- Corunastylis simulans (D.L.Jones) D.L.Jones & M.A.Clem.; Prasophyllum morrisii var. intermedium Rupp

Species of orchid

Genoplesium simulans, commonly known as the Blue Mountains midge orchid, is a small terrestrial orchid which is endemic to New South Wales, where it mainly occurs in the Blue Mountains. It has a single thin leaf and up to twenty three dark purplish-black flowers which lean downwards.

== Description ==
Genoplesium simulans is a terrestrial, perennial, deciduous, herb with an underground tuber and a single thin leaf 120–400 mm (5–20 in) long with the free part 10–20 mm (0.4–0.8 in) long. Between five and twenty three dark purplish-black flowers are arranged along a flowering stem 20–40 mm (0.8–2 in) long, reaching to a height of 160–460 mm (6–20 in). The flowers lean downwards and are 7–8 mm (0.28–0.31 in) wide. As with others in the genus, the flowers are inverted so that the labellum is above the column rather than below it. The dorsal sepal is broadly egg-shaped, 5 mm (0.2 in) long, 4 mm (0.2 in) wide and purple with darker bands. The edges of the dorsal sepal are densely hairy, the hairs up to 0.5 mm (0.02 in) long. The lateral sepals are linear to lance-shaped, about 7 mm (0.3 in) long, 1.5 mm (0.06 in) wide, dark reddish purple and spread widely apart from each other. The petals are narrow egg-shaped, about 4 mm (0.2 in) long, 1 mm (0.04 in) wide and greenish-purple with darker stripes and a few hairs on the edges. The labellum is narrow egg-shaped with the narrower end towards the base and is 5–6 mm (0.20–0.24 in) long, about 2 mm (0.08 in) wide with dark purplish-black hairs on the edges. There is a purplish-black, tapered callus in the centre of the labellum and covering about half of its surface. Flowering occurs from January to March.

== Taxonomy and naming ==
The Blue Mountains midge orchid was first formally described in 1991 by David Jones and the description was published in Australian Orchid Research. In 2002, Jones and Mark Clements changed the name to Corunastylis simulans but the change is not accepted by the Australian Plant Census. The specific epithet (simulans) is a Latin word meaning "imitating" or "copying", referring to the similarity of this species to G. morissii.

== Distribution and habitat ==
Genoplesium simulans grows in forest and with mosses in shallow soil over sandstone in the Blue Mountains and south to Mount Keira.
