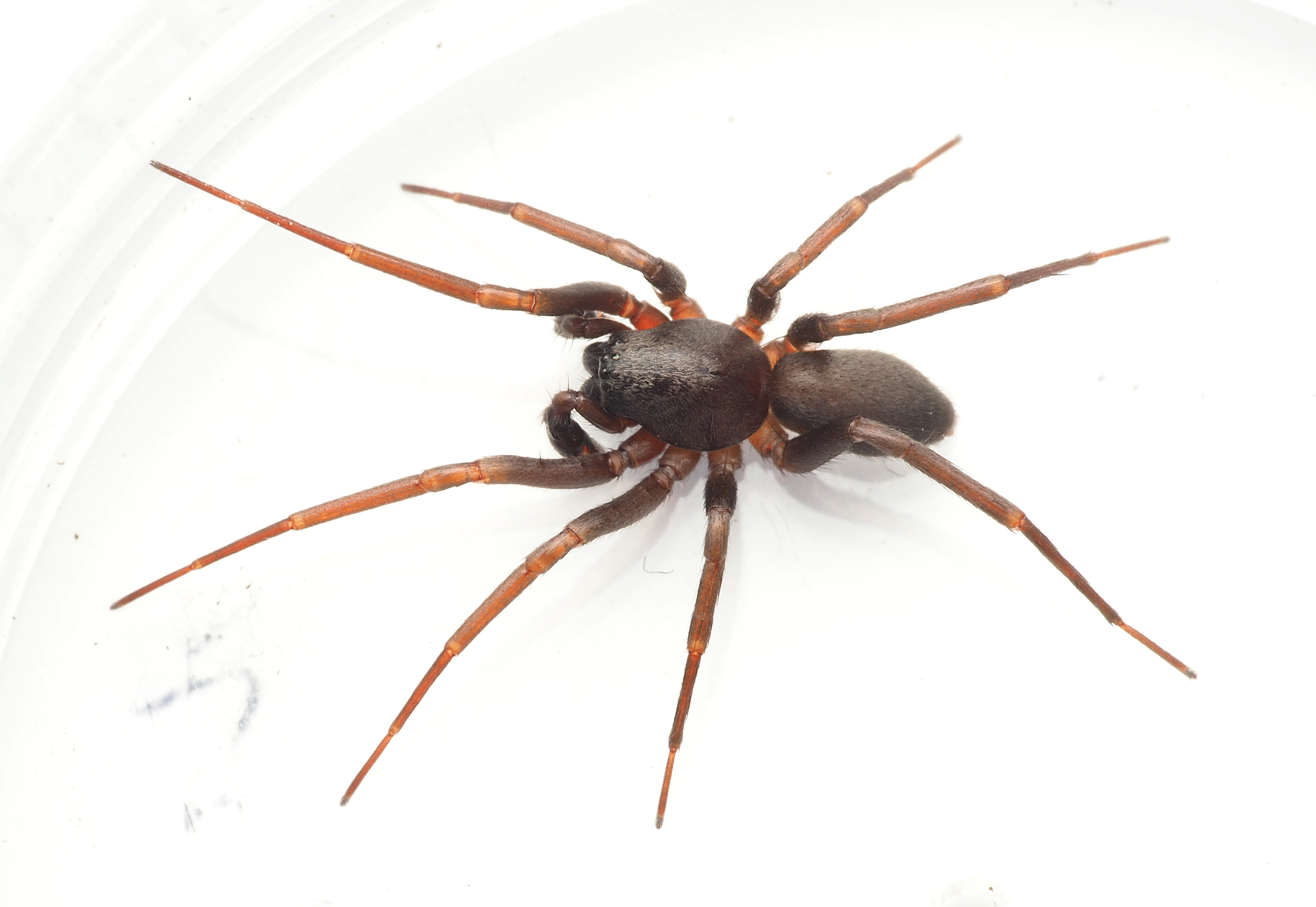

Scientific classification
- Kingdom: Animalia
- Phylum: Arthropoda
- Subphylum: Chelicerata
- Class: Arachnida
- Order: Araneae
- Infraorder: Araneomorphae
- Family: Corinnidae
- Genus: Creugas
- Species: C. gulosus

Binomial name
- Creugas gulosus Thorell, 1878

= Creugas gulosus =

Species of spider

Creugas gulosus is a species of true spider in the family Corinnidae. It is found in Southern America, has been introduced into Africa, Myanmar, Australia, and Pacific islands.
