= Genoplesium sagittiferum =

Horned midge orchid

Scientific classification
- Kingdom: Plantae
- Clade: Tracheophytes
- Clade: Angiosperms
- Clade: Monocots
- Order: Asparagales
- Family: Orchidaceae
- Subfamily: Orchidoideae
- Tribe: Diurideae
- Genus: Genoplesium
- Species: G. sagittiferum

Binomial name
- Genoplesium sagittiferum (Rupp) D.L.Jones & M.A.Clem.

Synonyms
- Prasophyllum sagittiferum Rupp; Corunastylis sagittifera (Rupp) D.L.Jones & M.A.Clem.

Species of orchid

Genoplesium sagittiferum, commonly known as the horned midge orchid, is a species of small terrestrial orchid that is endemic to New South Wales. It has a single thin leaf fused to the flowering stem and up to ten small, yellowish-green flowers with a hairy reddish labellum.

== Description ==
Genoplesium sagittiferum is a terrestrial, perennial, deciduous, herb with an underground tuber and a single thin leaf 50–100 mm (2–4 in) long and fused to the flowering stem with the free part 10–15 mm (0.4–0.6 in) long. Between two and ten yellowish-green flowers with red streaks are arranged along a flowering stem 5–20 mm (0.2–0.8 in) long and taller than the leaf. The flowers are 6–7 mm (0.2–0.3 in) long and 5–6 mm (0.20–0.24 in) wide and are inverted so that the labellum is above the column rather than below it. The dorsal sepal is egg-shaped, 3–4 mm (0.12–0.16 in) long, 2 mm (0.08 in) wide and pointed with hairless edges. The lateral sepals are linear to lance-shaped, 4–6 mm (0.16–0.24 in) long, about 1.5 mm (0.06 in) wide and spread widely apart from each other. The petals are lance-shaped to egg-shaped, about 3 mm (0.1 in) long, 1 mm (0.04 in) wide and sharply pointed with hairless edges. The labellum is reddish, egg-shaped with the narrower end towards the base, about 3 mm (0.1 in) long, 1 mm (0.04 in) wide, with short hairs on its edges. There is a tapered, dark red callus in the centre of the labellum and extending nearly to its tip. Flowering occurs between February and May.

== Taxonomy and naming ==
The horned midge orchid was first formally described in 1942 by Herman Rupp who gave it the name Prasophyllum sagittiferum. The type specimen was collected near Bell by Erwin Nubling and his wife and the description was published in The Victorian Naturalist. In 1989, David Jones and Mark Clements changed the name to Genoplesium sagittiferum and in 2002 Jones and Clements changed the name again to Corunastylis sagittifera but the latter changes is not accepted by the Australian Plant Census. The specific epithet (sagittiferum) is from the Latin words sagitta meaning "arrow" and fero meaning "to bear" or "to carry" referring to the arrowhead shape of the labellum callus.

== Distribution and habitat ==
Genoplesium sagittiferum grows with shrubs in sandy soils, sometimes in moss gardens on rock ledges. It is found in the higher parts of the Blue Mountains.
