= Creugas bajulus =

Scientific classification
- Kingdom: Animalia
- Phylum: Arthropoda
- Subphylum: Chelicerata
- Class: Arachnida
- Order: Araneae
- Infraorder: Araneomorphae
- Family: Corinnidae
- Genus: Creugas
- Species: C. bajulus

Binomial name
- Creugas bajulus (Gertsch, 1942)

Species of spider

Creugas bajulus is a species of true spider in the family Corinnidae. It is found in Mexico and the United States of America (California).
