= Genoplesium parvicallum =

Mountain-top midge orchid

Scientific classification
- Kingdom: Plantae
- Clade: Tracheophytes
- Clade: Angiosperms
- Clade: Monocots
- Order: Asparagales
- Family: Orchidaceae
- Subfamily: Orchidoideae
- Tribe: Diurideae
- Genus: Genoplesium
- Species: G. parvicallum

Binomial name
- Genoplesium parvicallum (Rupp) D.L.Jones & M.A.Clem.

Synonyms
- Prasophyllum parvicallum Rupp; Corunastylis parvicalla (Rupp) D.L.Jones & M.A.Clem.

Species of orchid

Genoplesium parvicallum, commonly known as the mountain-top midge-orchid, is a species of orchid which is endemic to Queensland. It is a small orchid with up to twenty five greenish flowers with purplish brown marking and is only known from mountaintops in the McPherson Range. It is treated as Corunastylis parvicalla in Queensland.

== Description ==
Genoplesium parvicallum is a terrestrial, perennial, deciduous, herb with an underground tuber and a single thin leaf 150–300 mm (6–10 in) long with the free part 15–25 mm (0.6–1 in) long. Between fifteen and twenty five greenish flowers with purplish brown stripes are arranged along a flowering stem 20–35 mm (0.8–1 in) long and much taller than the leaf. The flowers are about 8 mm (0.3 in) long, 7 mm (0.3 in) wide and as with others in the genus, are inverted so that the labellum is above the column rather than below it. The dorsal sepal is 4.5 mm (0.2 in) long, 2.5 mm (0.1 in) wide with a sharply pointed tip and a few hairs on its edges. The lateral sepals are 6.5 mm (0.3 in) long, 1 mm (0.04 in) wide with a humped base and spread widely apart from each other. The petals are 3.5 mm (0.1 in) long, 1 mm (0.04 in) wide with a pointed tip and hairy edges. The labellum is about 4 mm (0.2 in) long, 2 mm (0.08 in) wide and purplish with a pointed tip and red hairs on its edges. The labellum quivers in the slightest breeze and there is a small, club-shaped callus in its centre. Flowering occurs between December and February.

== Taxonomy and naming ==
The mountain-top midge orchid was first formally described in 1945 by Herman Rupp who gave it the name Prasophyllum parvicallum from a specimen collected on Mount Greville and the description was published in The Queensland Naturalist. In 2002, David Jones and Mark Clements changed its name to Corunastylis parvicalla and the species is known by that name in Queensland, but the change is not accepted by the Australian Plant Census. The specific epithet (parvicallum) is derived from the Latin word parvus meaning "little" referring to the small labellum callus of this orchid.

== Distribution and habitat ==
The mountain-top midge-orchid is only known from the summits of a few mountains in the McPherson Range where it grows in shallow soil over rock ledges with grasses and shrubs.
