= Genoplesium cuspidatum =

Scientific classification
- Kingdom: Plantae
- Clade: Tracheophytes
- Clade: Angiosperms
- Clade: Monocots
- Order: Asparagales
- Family: Orchidaceae
- Subfamily: Orchidoideae
- Tribe: Diurideae
- Genus: Genoplesium
- Species: G. cuspidatum

Binomial name
- Genoplesium cuspidatum (D.L.Jones & L.M.Copel.) J.M.H.Shaw

Synonyms
- Corunastylis cuspidata D.L.Jones & L.M.Copel.

Species of orchid

Genoplesium cuspidatum is a species of small terrestrial orchid endemic to eastern Australia. It has a single leaf fused to the flowering stem and between 6 and 28 reddish to dark purple flowers with prominent darker stripes.

== Description ==
Genoplesium cuspidatum is a terrestrial, perennial, deciduous, herb with an underground tuber and a single leaf 150–250 mm (5.9–9.8 in) long, sheathing the flowering stem with the free part 15–25 mm (0.59–0.98 in) long and 2.0–2.5 mm (0.079–0.098 in) wide. Between 6 and 28 reddish to dark purple flowers with prominent darker stripes are arranged along a flowering stem 200–300 mm (7.9–11.8 in) long. The flowers are about 5.5 mm (0.22 in) in diameter, and as with others in the genus, the flowers are inverted so that the labellum is above the column rather than below it. The dorsal sepal is broadly egg-shaped and forms a hood over the column, 5.0–5.5 millimetres (0.20–0.22 in) long, 2.6–3.0 mm (0.10–0.12 in) wide and concave. The lateral sepals are narrowly linear, 6.0–6.5 mm (0.24–0.26 in) long, about 1.5 mm (0.059 in) wide, spread widely apart and lack a humped base. The petals are egg-shaped, 4.0–4.5 mm (0.16–0.18 in) long, about 1.5 mm (0.059 in) wide with long-tapering tip. The labellum is elliptic to spatula-shaped, 3.5–4.0 mm (0.14–0.16 in) long, 2.0–2.5 mm (0.079–0.098 in) wide, fleshy and curved with purple hairs. There is a tapered, purple callus covering more than half the base of the labellum and extending nearly to its tip. Flowering occurs from December to March.

== Taxonomy and naming ==
This species of orchid was first formally described in 2017 by David Jones and Lachlan Copeland who gave it the name Corunastylis cuspidata and published the description in Australian Orchid Review from specimens Copland collected 10 km (6.2 mi) west of Ebor in 2004. In 2022, Julian Shaw changed the name to Genoplesium cuspidatum in the journal Telopea. and the name is accepted by Plants of the World Online. The specific epithet (cuspidatum) means "pointed", referring to the long-tapering petals, compared to those of Genoplesium archeri.

== Distribution and habitat ==
Genoplesium cuspidatum grows in moss gardens on granite outcrops and in deeper soils in woodland or open forest. It is only known from several populations north from Armidale on the Northern Tablelands New South Wales to the southern parts of the Darling Downs in south-eastern Queensland.
