= Genoplesium trifidum =

Trifid midge orchid

Scientific classification
- Kingdom: Plantae
- Clade: Tracheophytes
- Clade: Angiosperms
- Clade: Monocots
- Order: Asparagales
- Family: Orchidaceae
- Subfamily: Orchidoideae
- Tribe: Diurideae
- Genus: Genoplesium
- Species: G. trifidum

Binomial name
- Genoplesium trifidum (Rupp) M.A.M.Renner

Synonyms
- Corunastylis trifida (Rupp) D.L.Jones & M.A.Clem.; Prasophyllum trifidum Rupp

Species of orchid

Genoplesium trifidum, commonly known as the trifid midge orchid, is a small terrestrial orchid endemic to New South Wales. It has a single thin leaf fused to the flowering stem and up to twenty five dark purplish-black and green flowers. It grows in heath in scattered places in the Sydney basin.

== Description ==
Genoplesium trifidum is a terrestrial, perennial, deciduous, herb with an underground tuber and a single thin leaf 200–300 mm (8–10 in) long and fused to the flowering stem with the free part 15–20 mm (0.6–0.8 in) long. Between five and twenty five dark purplish-black and green flowers are arranged along a flowering stem 10–30 mm (0.4–1 in) long. The flowers lean downwards slightly and are 3–4 mm (0.12–0.16 in) long and 4–5 mm (0.16–0.20 in) wide. As with others in the genus, the flowers are inverted so that the labellum is above the column rather than below it. The dorsal sepal is 2–2.5 mm (0.08–0.1 in) long and about 1.5 mm (0.06 in) wide with hairless edges and darker coloured bands. The lateral sepals are about 3 mm (0.1 in) long and about 1 mm (0.04 in) wide, with a humped base and a sharply pointed tip. The petals are about 1.5 mm (0.06 in) long and about 1 mm (0.04 in) wide with hairless edges and a sharply pointed tip. The labellum is egg-shaped, about 3 mm (0.1 in) long and 1.5 mm (0.06 in) wide, thick and fleshy. There is a broad, tapering callus in the centre of the labellum and extending nearly to its tip. Flowering occurs from January to April.

== Taxonomy and naming ==
The blackish midge orchid was first formally described in 1941 by Herman Rupp who gave it the name Prasophyllum trifidum and published the description in The Victorian Naturalist. The specimen was collected near Castlecrag. In 2022, Matthew Renner changed the name to Genoplesium trifidum and the name is accepted by Plants of the World Online. The specific epithet (trifidum) is a Latin word meaning "three-cleft", referring to the shape of the column.

== Distribution and habitat ==
Genoplesium trifidum grows in heath or heathy forest between Kurri Kurri and Middle Harbour.
