= Genoplesium baueri =

Brittle midge orchid

Conservation status
- Endangered (EPBC Act)

Scientific classification
- Kingdom: Plantae
- Clade: Tracheophytes
- Clade: Angiosperms
- Clade: Monocots
- Order: Asparagales
- Family: Orchidaceae
- Subfamily: Orchidoideae
- Tribe: Diurideae
- Genus: Genoplesium
- Species: G. baueri

Binomial name
- Genoplesium baueri R.Br.

Synonyms
- Prasophyllum baueri (R.Br.) Poir.; Prasophyllum deaneanum Fitzg.; Prasophyllum deanianum Anon. nom. inval., nom. nud.; Prasophyllum deanianum Fitzg. orth. var.

Species of orchid

Genoplesium baueri, commonly known as the brittle midge orchid, is a small terrestrial orchid which is endemic to New South Wales. It has a single thin leaf and up to nine yellowish green to reddish brown flowers. It is mostly only found in coastal and near-coastal heath and woodland between Port Stephens and Ulladulla.

== Description ==
Genoplesium baueri is a terrestrial, perennial, deciduous, herb with an underground tuber and a single thin leaf 40–120 mm (2–5 in) long, about 2 mm (0.08 in) wide with the free part 10–20 mm (0.4–0.8 in) long. Up to nine yellowish green to reddish brown flowers are crowded along a flowering stem 60–150 mm (2–6 in) tall and taller than the leaf. The flowers are 8–11 mm (0.3–0.4 in) long, 11–13 mm (0.4–0.5 in) wide and as with others in the genus, are inverted so that the labellum is above the column rather than below it. The dorsal sepal is a broad egg shape, about 3 mm (0.1 in) long, 4 mm (0.2 in) wide with a long thin tip and hairless edges. The lateral sepals are linear to lance-shaped, 8–10 mm (0.3–0.4 in) long, about 2 mm (0.08 in) wide, boat-shaped near the tip and spread widely apart. The petals are egg-shaped, pointed, about 3 mm (0.1 in) long and 1.5 mm (0.06 in) wide with hairless, sometimes notched edges. The labellum is narrow egg-shaped to lance-shaped, about 4 mm (0.2 in) long, 2 mm (0.08 in) wide with the edges rolled and hairless. There is a fleshy, raised, channelled callus in the centre of the labellum. Flowering occurs between December and April and is enhanced by fire the previous summer.

== Taxonomy and naming ==
The brittle leek orchid was first formally described in 1810 by Robert Brown who published the description in Prodromus Florae Novae Hollandiae et Insulae Van Diemen. The specific epithet (baueri) honours Ferdinand Bauer.

== Distribution and habitat ==
Genoplesium baueri grows in heath, woodland and forest, mostly in coastal and near-coastal areas. It has been recorded between Port Stephens and Ulladulla and as far inland as Woodford and Penrose State Forest.

== Conservation ==
This midge orchid is only known from about 200 plants in thirteen sites and has been classed as "Endangered" under the New South Wales Threatened Species Conservation Act and the Commonwealth Government Environment Protection and Biodiversity Conservation Act 1999 (EPBC) Act.
