= Genoplesium superbum =

Pink midge orchid

Scientific classification
- Kingdom: Plantae
- Clade: Tracheophytes
- Clade: Angiosperms
- Clade: Monocots
- Order: Asparagales
- Family: Orchidaceae
- Subfamily: Orchidoideae
- Tribe: Diurideae
- Genus: Genoplesium
- Species: G. simulans

Binomial name
- Genoplesium simulans D.L.Jones

Synonyms
- Corunastylis superba (D.L.Jones) D.L.Jones & M.A.Clem.

Species of orchid

Genoplesium superbum, commonly known as the pink midge orchid or superb midge orchid, is a species of small terrestrial orchid that is endemic to New South Wales. It has a single thin leaf and up to fifteen dark pinkish-purple flowers, which lean downwards. It is listed as "endangered" in New South Wales because of its limited distribution and disturbance of its habitat.

== Description ==
Genoplesium superbum is a terrestrial, perennial, deciduous, herb with an underground tuber and a single thin leaf 140–180 mm (6–7 in) long with the free part 15–20 mm (0.6–0.8 in) long. Between four and fifteen dark pinkish-purple flowers are arranged along a flowering stem 25–50 mm (1–2 in) long, reaching to a height of 170–230 mm (7–9 in). The flowers lean downwards and are about 12 mm (0.5 in) wide. As with others in the genus, the flowers are inverted so that the labellum is above the column rather than below it. The dorsal sepal is egg-shaped, about 5.5 mm (0.2 in) long and 3 mm (0.1 in) wide with red stripes and hairy edges. The lateral sepals are linear to lance-shaped, about 10 mm (0.4 in) long, 1.5 mm (0.06 in) wide, dark pinkish-purple and spread widely apart from each other. The petals are lance-shaped to egg-shaped, about 5 mm (0.2 in) long, 2 mm (0.08 in) wide with dark red stripes and hairy edges. The labellum is narrow egg-shaped, pinkish-purple, about 7.5 mm (0.3 in) long and 3 mm (0.1 in) wide with tangled, pinkish-mauve hairs up to 2 mm (0.08 in) long on its edges. There is a pale green to cream-coloured callus with purplish markings in the centre of the labellum and covering less than half of its surface. Flowering occurs from December to March.

== Taxonomy and naming ==
The pink midge orchid was first formally described in 1991 by David Jones and the description was published in Australian Orchid Research. In 2002, Jones and Mark Clements changed the name to Corunastylis superba but that name is not accepted by the Australian Plant Census. The specific epithet (superbum) is a Latin word meaning "excellent, superior or splendid", referring to the relatively large, colourful flowers of this orchid.

== Distribution and habitat ==
Genoplesium simulans grows with low shrubs in and near the Morton National Park.

== Conservation ==
This midge orchid is only known from two locations near Nerriga and another north of Wallerawang. The species is threatened by its small population size, habitat disturbance caused by vehicle damage and weed infestation, especially of ox-eye daisy. It has been classed as "Endangered" under the New South Wales Biodiversity Conservation Act 2016.
