= Genoplesium littorale =

Tuncurry midge orchid

Conservation status
- Critically endangered (EPBC Act)

Scientific classification
- Kingdom: Plantae
- Clade: Tracheophytes
- Clade: Angiosperms
- Clade: Monocots
- Order: Asparagales
- Family: Orchidaceae
- Subfamily: Orchidoideae
- Tribe: Diurideae
- Genus: Genoplesium
- Species: G. littorale

Binomial name
- Genoplesium littorale D.L.Jones

Synonyms
- Corunastylis littoralis (D.L.Jones) D.L.Jones & M.A.Clem.

Species of orchid

Genoplesium littorale, commonly known as the Tuncurry midge orchid, is a species of small terrestrial orchid endemic that is endemic to New South Wales. It has a single thin leaf fused to the flowering stem and up to thirty small green flowers with a purple-brown labellum. It is only known from fewer than two thousand plants in a small area on the New South Wales North Coast and is critically endangered.

== Description ==
Genoplesium littorale is a terrestrial, perennial, deciduous, herb with an underground tuber and a single thin, dark green leaf, 100–250 mm (4–10 in) long with a reddish base and fused to the flowering stem with the free part 10–18 mm (0.4–0.7 in) long. Between five and thirty green flowers are crowded along a flowering stem 10–30 mm (0.4–1 in) tall. The flowers lean downwards, are about 5 mm (0.2 in) long, 4 mm (0.2 in) wide and inverted so that the labellum is above the column rather than below it. The dorsal sepal is about 4 mm (0.16 in) long and 2.5 mm (0.1 in) wide, with a pointed tip and hairless edges. The lateral sepals are about 4.5 mm (0.2 in) long, 1 mm (0.04 in) wide, point downwards and spread widely apart from each other. The petals are about 3 mm (0.1 in) long, 1 mm (0.04 in) wide, with a sharply pointed tip and hairless edges. The labellum is purplish brown, oblong, about 2.5 mm (0.1 in) long, 1 mm (0.04 in) wide with a curled, sharply pointed tip and hairless edges. There is a callus in the centre of the labellum and extending almost to its tip. Flowering occurs from March to May.

== Taxonomy and naming ==
The Tuncurry midge orchid was first formally described in 2001 by David Jones from a specimen collected near Tuncurry and the description was published in The Orchadian. In 2002, David Jones and Mark Clements changed the name to Corunastylis littorale but the change is not accepted by the Australian Plant Census. The specific epithet (littorale) is derived from the Latin word littus meaning "shore".

== Distribution and habitat ==
Genoplesium littorale grows in scrub on stabilised sand dunes in the Forster-Tuncurry area.

== Ecology ==
Five species of flies in the genera Conioscinella and Cadrema have been shown to pollinate G. littorale. The insects are rewarded with nectar, although the nectar supply is quickly depleted by visiting flies.

== Conservation ==
In 2010, the total population of the G. littorale was estimated to be 1,960 plants. The species is threatened by weed invasion, grazing by rabbits and possible future residential developments. It is listed as "critically endangered" (CR) under the Environment Protection and Biodiversity Conservation Act 1999 (EPBC Act) and under the New South Wales Government NSW New South Wales Threatened Species Conservation Act 1995.
