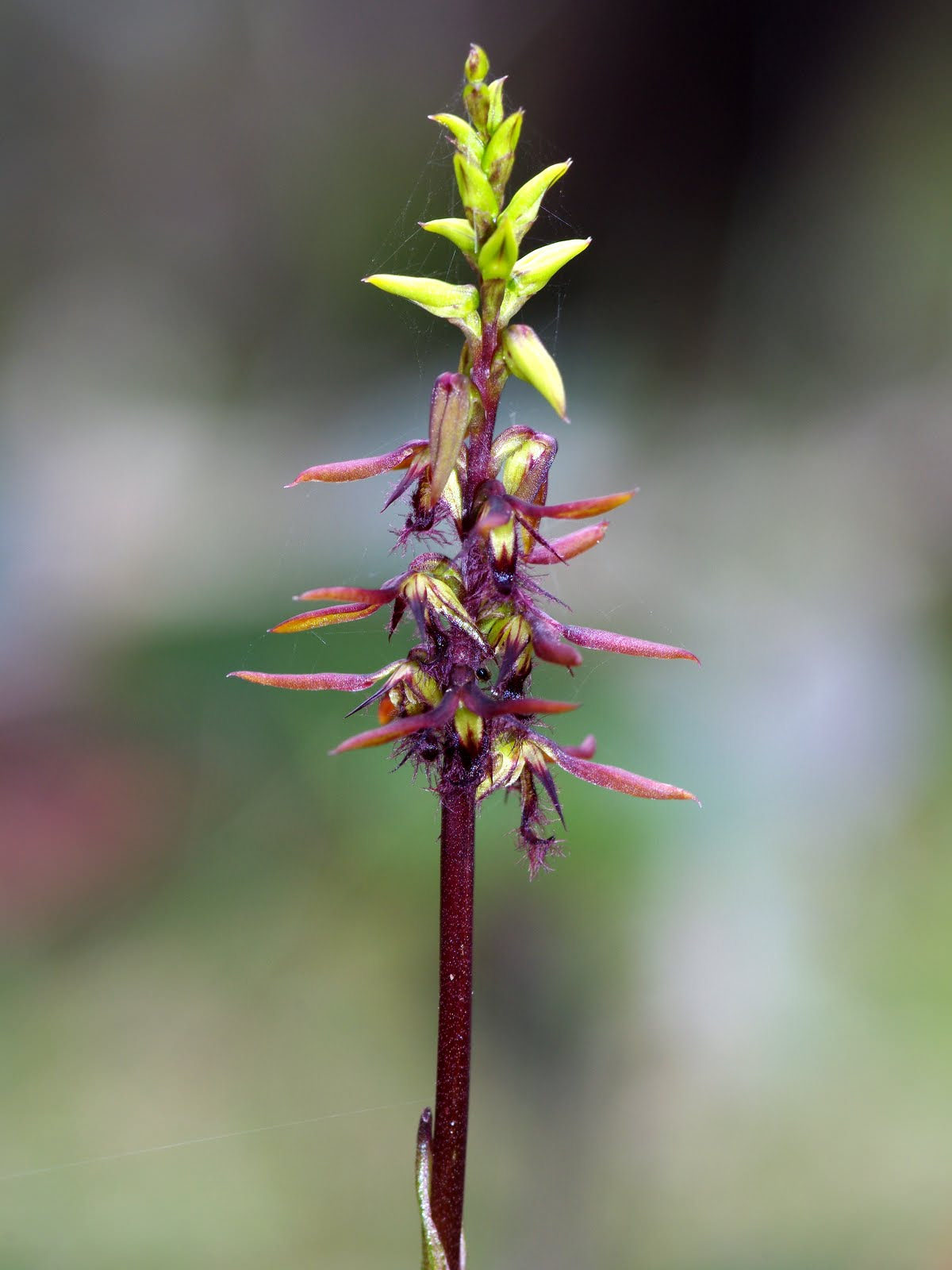

Scientific classification
- Kingdom: Plantae
- Clade: Embryophytes
- Clade: Tracheophytes
- Clade: Spermatophytes
- Clade: Angiosperms
- Clade: Monocots
- Order: Asparagales
- Family: Orchidaceae
- Subfamily: Orchidoideae
- Tribe: Diurideae
- Genus: Genoplesium
- Species: G. morrisii

Binomial name
- Genoplesium morrisii (Nicholls)D.L.Jones & M.A.Clem.

Synonyms
- Corunastylis morrisii (Nicholls) D.L.Jones & M.A.Clem.; Prasophyllum morrisii Nicholls; Prasophyllum morrisii var. contortum Nicholls; Prasophyllum morrisii var. intermedium Rupp

= Genoplesium morrisii =

Bearded midge orchid

Species of orchid

Genoplesium morrisii, commonly known as the bearded midge orchid and known as Corunastylis morrisii in Australia, is a small terrestrial orchid endemic to south-eastern Australia. It has a single thin leaf fused to the flowering stem and up to fifteen small, dark purplish-black or green and purple flowers.

== Description ==
Genoplesium morrisii is a terrestrial, perennial, deciduous, herb with an underground tuber and a single thin leaf 200–250 mm (8–10 in) long and fused to the flowering stem with the free part 10–22 mm (0.4–0.9 in) long. Between three and fifteen dark purplish-black or green and purple flowers are crowded along a flowering stem 35–50 mm (1–2 in) tall. The flowers are about 11 mm (0.4 in) long and 9 mm (0.4 in) wide and are inverted so that the labellum is above the column rather than below it. The dorsal sepal is egg-shaped, 5–6 mm (0.20–0.24 in) long and about 2.5 mm (0.1 in) wide with dark purpish-black stripes. The lateral sepals are linear to lance-shaped, about 7 mm (0.3 in) long, 1.5 mm (0.06 in) wide and spread apart from each other. The petals are lance-shaped to egg-shaped, about 4 mm (0.2 in) long and 1.5 mm (0.06 in) wide with a pointed tip. The labellum is lance-shaped, to narrow egg-shaped, about 4 mm (0.2 in) long, 1.5 mm (0.06 in) wide and vibrates in the slightest breeze. The sides of the labellum are lines with many coarse, spreading cilia and there is a narrow oblong callus in the centre of the labellum and extending about halfway to its tip. Flowering occurs between January and April.

== Taxonomy and naming ==
The bearded midge orchid was first formally described in 1931 by William Henry Nicholls who gave it the name Prasophyllum morrisii and published the description in The Victorian Naturalist. In 1989, David Jones and Mark Clements changed the name to Genoplesium morrisii and in 2002 changed the name again to Corunastylis morrisii. The specific epithet (morrisii) honours "Mr. P.F. Morris of the National Herbarium, whose name I have bestowed upon this dainty little species".

== Distribution and habitat ==
Genoplesium morrisii grows in forest, woodland and heath and is widespread and common in the southern half of Victoria. It is rarely encountered in Tasmania and possibly grows in the far south-east of New South Wales.

== Conservation ==
Corunastylis morrisii is classed as "Endangered" under the Tasmanian Threatened Species Protection Act 1995. It is only known from a few near-coastal areas in the north and south where fewer than 100 mature plants are thought to survive. The main threats to the species in Tasmania are land clearing, inappropriate fire regimes and inappropriate disturbance.
