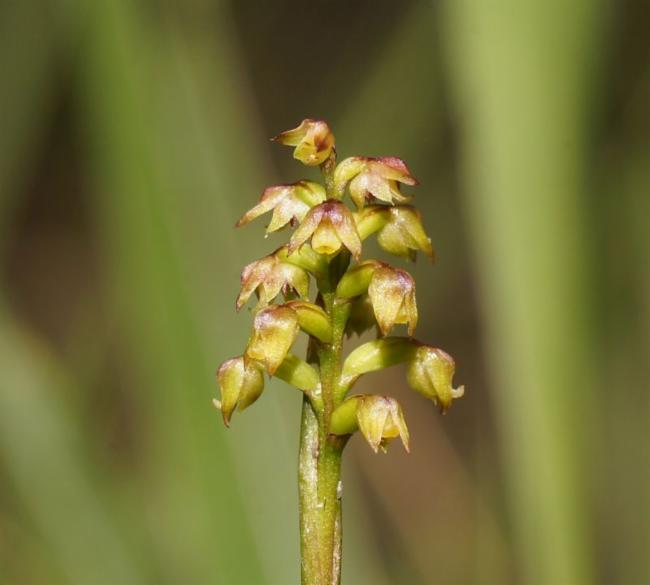
- Genoplesium pumilum growing near Erowal Bay

Scientific classification
- Kingdom: Plantae
- Clade: Tracheophytes
- Clade: Angiosperms
- Clade: Monocots
- Order: Asparagales
- Family: Orchidaceae
- Subfamily: Orchidoideae
- Tribe: Diurideae
- Genus: Genoplesium
- Species: G. pumilum

Binomial name
- Genoplesium pumilum (Hook.f.)D.L.Jones & M.A.Clem.

Synonyms
- Prasophyllum pumilum Hook.f.; Corunastylis pumila (Hook.f.) D.L.Jones & M.A.Clem.

= Genoplesium pumilum =

Green midge orchid

Species of orchid

Genoplesium pumilum, commonly known as the green midge orchid in Australia, and the yellow gumland leek orchid in New Zealand is a small terrestrial orchid native to south-eastern Australia and New Zealand. It has a single thin leaf fused to the flowering stem and up to twenty five green to yellowish-green flowers which sometimes have red markings. Australian and New Zealand authorities use the name Corunastylis pumila.

== Description ==
Genoplesium pumilum is a terrestrial, perennial, deciduous, herb with an underground tuber and a single thin leaf 100–200 mm (4–8 in) long and fused to the flowering stem with the free part 10–20 mm (0.4–0.8 in) long. Between five and twenty five green to yellowish-green red flowers are crowded along a flowering stem 15–25 mm (0.6–1 in) long and taller than the leaf. The flowers lean forwards and are about 5 mm (0.2 in) long, 3 mm (0.12 in) wide and sometimes have red markings. As with others in the genus, the flowers are inverted so that the labellum is above the column rather than below it. The dorsal sepal is egg-shaped, about 2 mm (0.08 in) long and 1.5 mm (0.06 in) wide, sometimes with a small gland on its tip. The lateral sepals are linear to lance-shaped, about 4 mm (0.16 in) long, 1 mm (0.04 in) wide, spread apart from each other and often have a gland at the tip. The petals are egg-shaped, about 2 mm (0.08 in) long and 1 mm (0.04 in) wide with hairless margins but sometimes a gland on the tip. The labellum is egg-shaped, thick and fleshy, 2.5–3 mm (0.098–0.12 in) long, 1.5–2 mm (0.06–0.08 in) wide with fine teeth along its edges. There is a callus in the centre of the labellum and extending almost to its tip. Flowering occurs between January and May in Australia and between February and October in New Zealand.

== Taxonomy and naming ==
The green midge orchid was first formally described in 1853 by Joseph Dalton Hooker who gave it the name Prasophyllum pumilum and published the description in Flora Novae-Zelandiae. In 1989, David Jones and Mark Clements changed the name to Genoplesium pumilum and in 2002 changed the name again to Corunastylis pumila. The specific epithet (pumilum) is a Latin word meaning "dwarfish" or "little".

== Distribution and habitat ==
Genoplesium pumilum grows in wet heath, wallum and the edges of swamps. In Tasmania it grows on buttongrass plains and in New Zealand on sparsely vegetated gumland scrub. In New South Wales it occurs mainly in coastal districts and in Victoria in the far east and on French Island. It is also common in coastal areas of Tasmania and in New Zealand is found on the North and Chatham Islands.
