= Genoplesium alticola =

Conservation status
- Vulnerable (NCA)

Scientific classification
- Kingdom: Plantae
- Clade: Tracheophytes
- Clade: Angiosperms
- Clade: Monocots
- Order: Asparagales
- Family: Orchidaceae
- Subfamily: Orchidoideae
- Tribe: Diurideae
- Genus: Genoplesium
- Species: G. alticola

Binomial name
- Genoplesium alticola D.L.Jones & B.Gray

Synonyms
- Corunastylis alticola (D.L.Jones & B.Gray) D.L.Jones & M.A.Clem.

Species of orchid

Genoplesium alticola, commonly known as tableland midge orchid, is a small terrestrial orchid endemic to Queensland, Australia. It has a single thin leaf fused to the flowering stem and up to twenty five small, hairy, dark purplish-red and green flowers. It grows in two small areas of the state at altitudes between 600 and 750 m (2,000 and 2,500 ft).

== Description ==
Genoplesium alticola is a terrestrial, perennial, deciduous, herb with an underground tuber and a single thin leaf 150–250 mm (6–10 in) long and fused to the flowering stem with the free part 15–22 mm (0.6–0.9 in) long. Between ten and twenty five dark purplish-red and green flowers are well spaced along a flowering stem 18–40 mm (0.7–2 in) tall but lower than the leaf. The flowers are 5–6 mm (0.20–0.24 in) long, about 5 mm (0.2 in) wide and are inverted so that the labellum is above the column rather than below it. The dorsal sepal is egg-shaped, about 5 mm (0.20 in) long and 4 mm (0.2 in) wide with darker edges and three lines along its centre. The edges of the dorsal sepal have short, dark hairs. The lateral sepals are linear to lance-shaped, dark purplish red, about 5 mm (0.2 in) long, 1.5 mm (0.06 in) wide and spread widely apart from each other. The petals are a broad egg-shape, dark purplish red with marking similar to those on the dorsal sepal and are about 3 mm (0.1 in) long and 1.5 mm (0.06 in) wide densely hairy edges. The labellum is elliptic to egg-shaped with the narrower end towards the base, about 3 mm (0.1 in) long, 1.5 mm (0.06 in) wide, with short, coarse hairs on the sides. There is an oblong callus in the centre of the labellum and covering about half of its surface. Flowering occurs between December and February.

== Taxonomy and naming ==
Genoplesium alticola was first formally described in 1991 by Australian botanists David Jones and Bruce Gray from a specimen collected near Danbulla and the description was published in Australian Orchid Research.

While the name Genoplesium alticola is accepted by Plants of the World Online, it is not accepted in Australia — instead the later name Corunastylis alticola is recognised by both the national and Queensland authorities.

=== Etymology ===
The specific epithet (alticola) is derived from the Latin words altus meaning 'high' and cola meaning 'dweller', referring to the plant's relatively high altitude habitat.

== Distribution and habitat ==
At the time it was first described in 1991, this species was known from only two locations — the Herberton Range west and south of Atherton and on Walshs Pyramid approximately 45 km (28 mi) to the east of Atherton. As of October 2025 there are nine occurrences recorded, ranging from Mount Windsor, west of Cape Tribulation, south to about Cardwell. It has been found in open stunted forest on ridges, on clay and sandy soils, at altitudes around 600 to 750 m (1,970 to 2,460 ft). It often grows amongst low shrubs, herbs and grasses.
