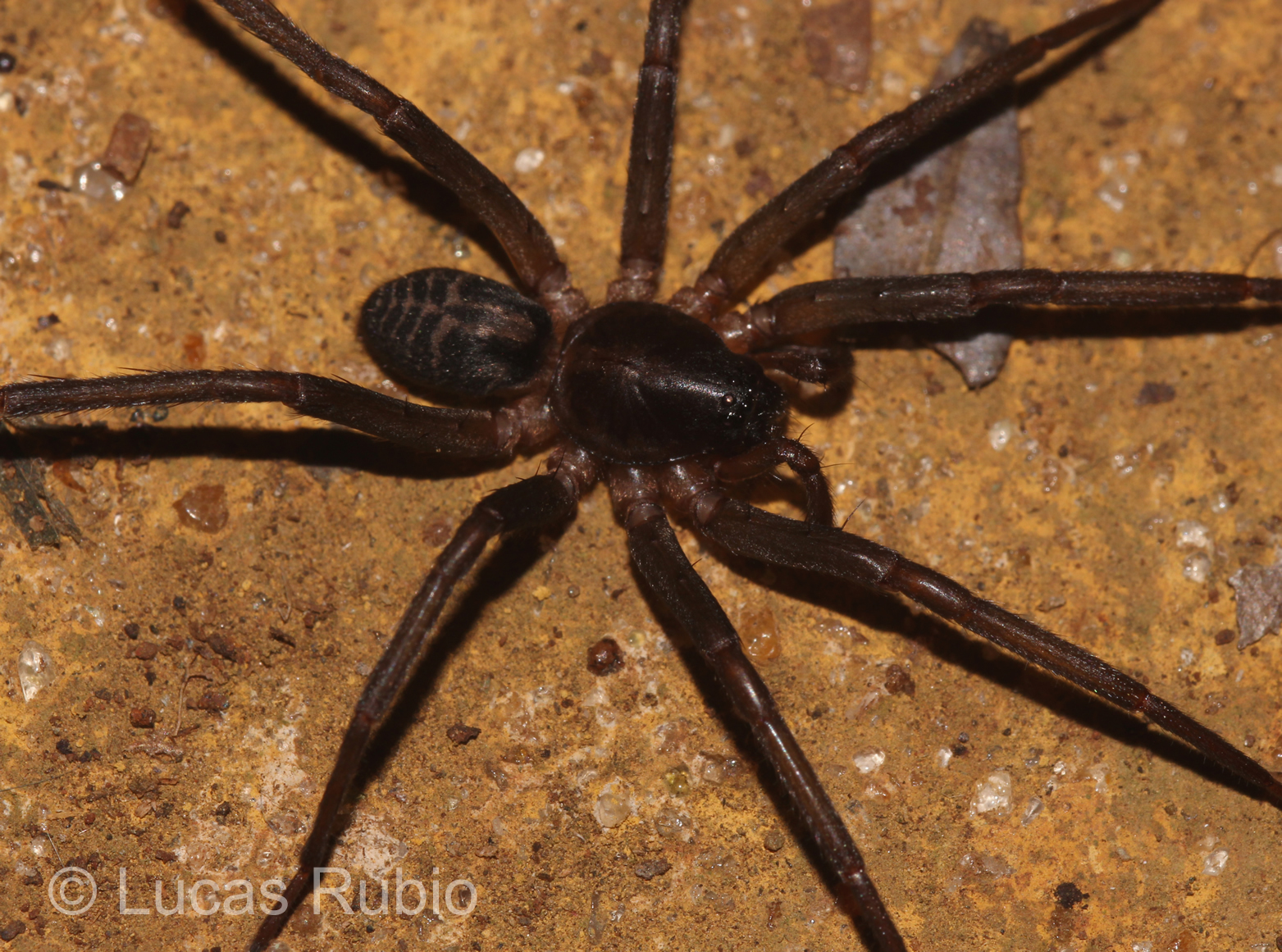
- Creugas lisei

Scientific classification
- Kingdom: Animalia
- Phylum: Arthropoda
- Subphylum: Chelicerata
- Class: Arachnida
- Order: Araneae
- Infraorder: Araneomorphae
- Family: Corinnidae
- Genus: Creugas; Thorell, 1878

Type species
- C. gulosus Thorell, 1878

Species
- 20, see text

= Creugas =

Genus of spiders

Creugas is a genus of corinnid sac spiders first described by Tamerlan Thorell in 1878.

== Species ==
As of April 2019 it contains twenty species in the Americas from the United States of America (USA) to Brazil, and one (C. gulosus) with a cosmopolitan distribution:

- Creugas annamae (Gertsch & Davis, 1940) – Mexico
- Creugas apophysarius (Caporiacco, 1947) – Guyana
- Creugas bajulus (Gertsch, 1942) – Mexico, USA (California)
- Creugas bellator (L. Koch, 1866) – Venezuela, Colombia, Ecuador
- Creugas berlandi Bonaldo, 2000 – Ecuador
- Creugas bicuspis (F. O. Pickard-Cambridge, 1899) – Mexico
- Creugas cinnamius Simon, 1888 – Mexico
- Creugas comondensis Jiménez, 2007 – Mexico
- Creugas epicureanus (Chamberlin, 1924) – Mexico
- Creugas falculus (F. O. Pickard-Cambridge, 1899) – Mexico
- Creugas guaycura Jiménez, 2008 – Mexico
- Creugas gulosus Thorell, 1878 (type) – Southern America. Introduced to Africa, Myanmar, Australia, Pacific islands
- Creugas lisei Bonaldo, 2000 – Brazil, Uruguay, Argentina
- Creugas mucronatus (F. O. Pickard-Cambridge, 1899) – Costa Rica, Panama
- Creugas navus (F. O. Pickard-Cambridge, 1899) – Mexico
- Creugas nigricans (C. L. Koch, 1841) – Mexico, Colombia
- Creugas plumatus (L. Koch, 1866) – Colombia
- Creugas praeceps (F. O. Pickard-Cambridge, 1899) – Mexico
- Creugas silvaticus (Chickering, 1937) – Panama
- Creugas uncatus (F. O. Pickard-Cambridge, 1899) – Mexico
