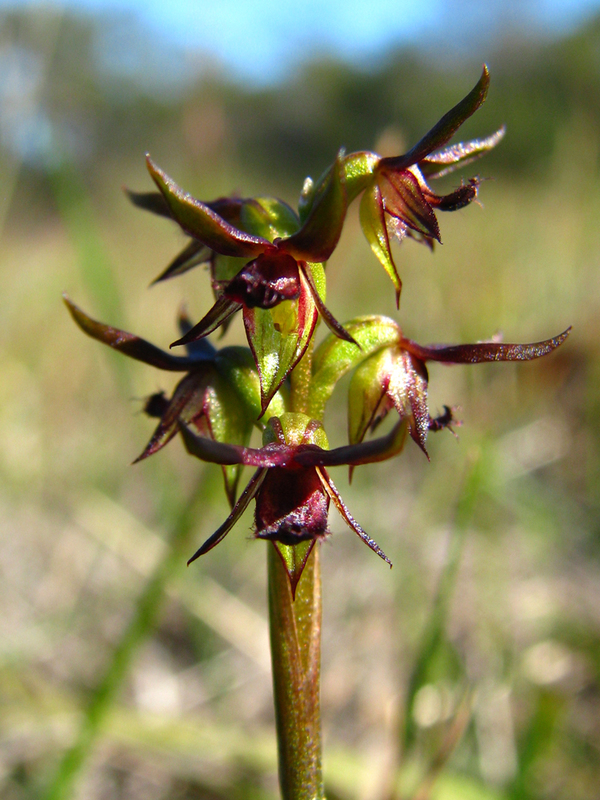
- In the Brisbane Water National Park

Scientific classification
- Kingdom: Plantae
- Clade: Tracheophytes
- Clade: Angiosperms
- Clade: Monocots
- Order: Asparagales
- Family: Orchidaceae
- Subfamily: Orchidoideae
- Tribe: Diurideae
- Genus: Genoplesium
- Species: G. archeri

Binomial name
- Genoplesium archeri (R.S.Rogers) D.L.Jones & M.A.Clem.

Synonyms
- Prasophyllum archeri Hook.f.; Corunastylis archeri (Hook.f.) D.L.Jones & M.A.Clem.

= Genoplesium archeri =

Species of orchid

Genoplesium archeri, commonly known as the elfin midge orchid and as Corunastylis archeri in Australia, is a small terrestrial orchid endemic to south-eastern Australia. It has a single thin leaf fused to the flowering stem and up to fifteen small, hairy, yellowish green flowers with purple stripes. It grows in a wide range of habitats in New South Wales, Victoria and Tasmania.

== Description ==
Genoplesium archeri is a terrestrial, perennial, deciduous, herb with an underground tuber and a single thin leaf 100–150 mm (4–6 in) long and fused to the flowering stem with the free part 20–25 mm (0.8–1 in) long. Between two and fifteen yellowish green flowers are crowded along a flowering stem 15–30 mm (0.6–1 in) tall and about as tall as the leaf. The flowers are about 7 mm (0.3 in) long and 5 mm (0.2 in) wide and are inverted so that the labellum is above the column rather than below it. The dorsal sepal is egg-shaped, about 4.5 mm (0.2 in) long and 2.5 mm (0.1 in) wide with hairless edges, purple stripes and a pointed tip. The lateral sepals are linear to lance-shaped, about 5 mm (0.2 in) long, 1.5 mm (0.06 in) wide and spread widely apart from each other. The petals are egg-shaped, about 4 mm (0.2 in) long and 1.5 mm (0.06 in) wide with purple stripes and hairless edges. The labellum is purple, broadly egg-shaped, about 3 mm (0.1 in) long, 2 mm (0.08 in) wide, with a curled, sharply pointed tip and coarse hairs up to 1 mm (0.04 in) long on the sides. There is a narrow egg-shaped callus in the centre of the labellum and extending nearly to its tip. Flowering occurs from November to March.

== Taxonomy and naming ==
The elfin midge orchid was first formally described in 1858 by Joseph Dalton Hooker who gave it the name Prasophyllum archeri from a specimen collected by William Archer near Cheshunt. The description was published in The botany of the Antarctic voyage of H.M. discovery ships Erebus and Terror. III. Flora Tasmaniae. In 1989, David Jones and Mark Clements changed the name to Genoplesium archeri and in 2002 changed the name again to Corunastylis archeri. The specific epithet (archeri) honours the collector of the type specimen.

== Distribution and habitat ==
Genoplesium archeri grows in a wide range of habitats including swamp margins and open forest. It is found in New South Wales mainly between Guyra and the Blue Mountains, is widespread in Victoria and in Tasmania at altitudes up to 200 m (700 ft) above sea level.
