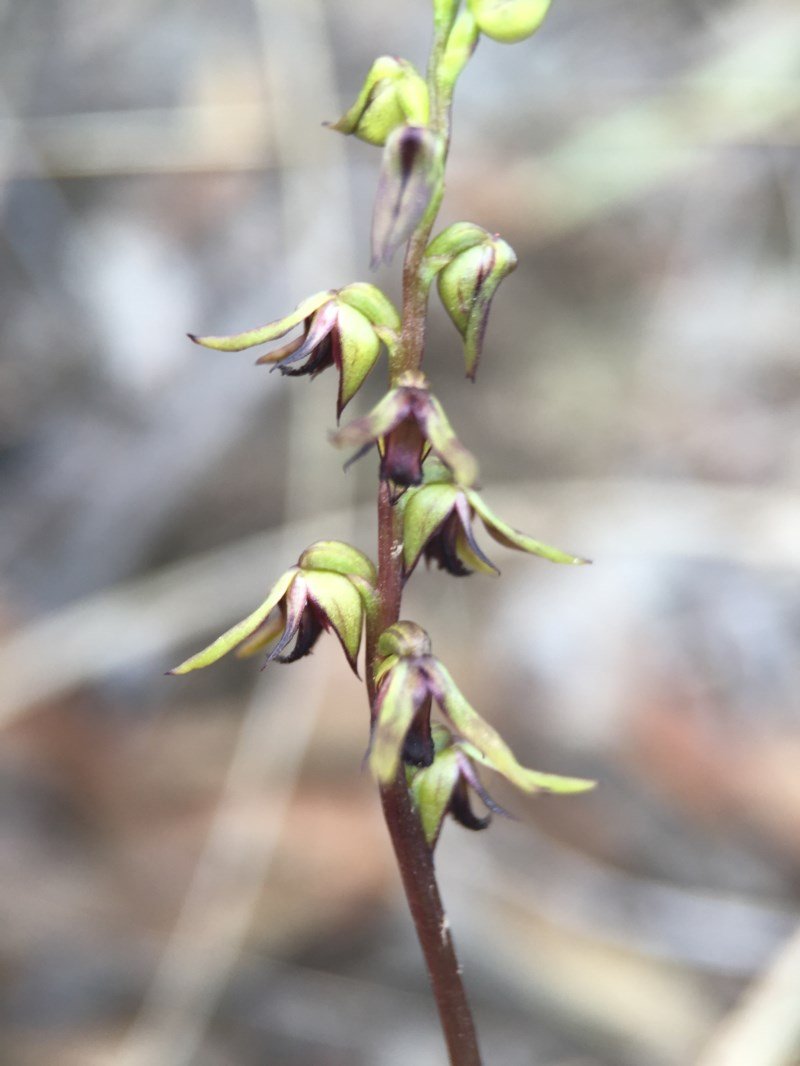
- In the Aranda Bushland

Scientific classification
- Kingdom: Plantae
- Clade: Tracheophytes
- Clade: Angiosperms
- Clade: Monocots
- Order: Asparagales
- Family: Orchidaceae
- Subfamily: Orchidoideae
- Tribe: Diurideae
- Genus: Genoplesium
- Species: G. clivicola

Binomial name
- Genoplesium clivicola (D.L.Jones) J.M.H.Shaw

Synonyms
- Corunastylis clivicola D.L.Jones

= Genoplesium clivicola =

Species of orchid

Genoplesium clivicola is species of small terrestrial orchid that is endemic to south-eastern Australia. It has a single thin leaf fused to the flowering stem and up to twenty five small, greenish and reddish flowers. It grows in forest and woodland in Victoria, the Australian Capital Territory and New South Wales.

== Description ==
Genoplesium clivicola is a terrestrial, perennial, deciduous, herb with an underground tuber and a single thin leaf fused to the flowering stem. Up to twenty five greenish flowers with reddish or purplish markings are arranged along a flowering stem 10–40 mm (0.4–2 in) long and reaching to a height of 80–250 mm (3–10 in). The flowers are 3–4 mm (0.1–0.2 in) wide and are inverted so that the labellum is above the column rather than below it. The dorsal sepal is egg-shaped with the narrower end towards the base, 3.5–4 mm (0.1–0.2 in) long and about 2.5 mm (0.1 in) wide. The lateral sepals are linear to lance-shaped, about 4.5–5 mm (0.2–0.2 in) long, 1–1.5 mm (0.04–0.06 in) wide, with a pouched base and spread apart from each other. The petals are egg-shaped, 2.5–3 mm (0.098–0.12 in) long and about 1 mm (0.04 in) wide with a pointed tip. The labellum is egg-shaped with the narrower end towards the base, 2.5–3 mm (0.098–0.12 in) long, about 1 mm (0.04 in) wide and there is a narrow egg-shaped callus in the centre of the labellum and extending nearly to its tip. Flowering occurs from January to May.

== Taxonomy and naming ==
Corunastylis clivicola was first formally described in 2007 by David Jones from a specimen collected in the Black Mountain Reserve and the description was published in The Orchadian. In 2014 Julian Shaw changed the name to Genoplesium clivicola. The specific epithet (clivicola) is derived from the Latin word clivus meaning "ascent", "elevation", "hill" or "sloping hillside" with the suffix -cola meaning "dweller".

== Distribution and habitat ==
Genoplesium clivicola grows in Victoria north of the Great Dividing Range, except for a disjunct population in the Brisbane Ranges National Park. In New South Wales it is found on the Central and Southern Tablelands, including the Australian Capital Territory.
