= J. G. O. Tepper =

Prussian botanist and entomologist

Johann Gottlieb Otto Tepper
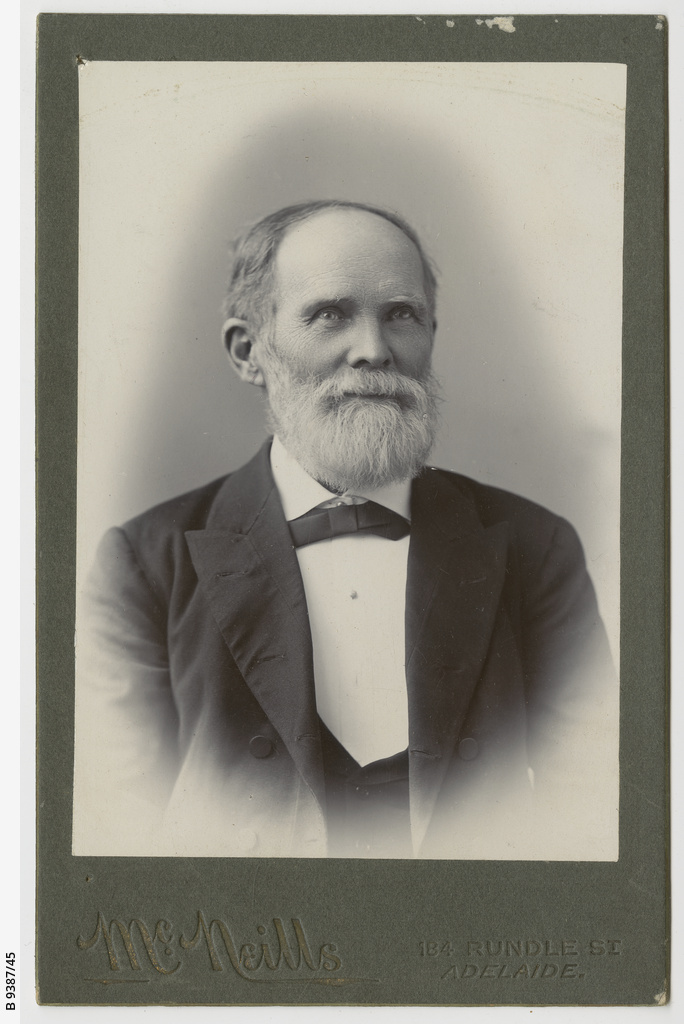
- Born: April 9, 1841; Neutomischel, Prussia
- Died: February 16, 1923 (aged 81)

Johann Gottlieb Otto Tepper (19 April 1841 – 16 February 1923) was a Prussian-born botanist, teacher, plant collector and entomologist who spent most of his life living and working in Australia. He spent much of his career with the South Australian Museum.

== History ==
Tepper was born in Neutomischel, Posen, Prussia (now Poland) on 19 April 1841. He was the eldest son of Johann Christoph Tepper (c. 1815 – 14 November 1891), and Johanne Wilhelmine Tepper, née Protsch, and emigrated with them aboard Gellert, arriving in South Australia in 1847. They settled at Lyndoch, where he was educated before receiving tuition under Dr. Carl Muecke.

He became master of a small country school, then joined the Education Department and taught at Monarto, Nuriootpa and Clarendon.

In 1883 he was appointed natural history collector to the South Australian Museum and from 1888 until his retirement, on 30 June 1911 as entomologist, for which he gave valued service. He was a longtime member of the Royal Society, and a foundation member and several times president, of the Field Naturalists Society. He was elected a Fellow of the Linnean Society of London in 1879, was a Life Fellow of the Society of Science, Letters and Art, London, and an active member of around thirty learned societies including the American Association for the Advancement of Science. He was a correspondent and friend of the meteorologist Clement Wragge.

In 1982, the Native Orchid Society of South Australia published a special edition of their Journal to commemorate the valuable work done in South Australia by J.G.O. Tepper.

== Family ==
(Johann Gottlieb) Otto Tepper (1841 – 16 February 1923) married Jane Brock ( – ) on 22 April 1867

- John William Otto Tepper (16 October 1868 – 6 May 1957), lived in Perth, Western Australia
- Isabella Wilhelmine Victoria Tepper (28 October 1870 – ) married William Lachlan Cowan on 25 November 1895
- Marion Elizabeth Lilliana Tepper (20 July 1875 – 10 September 1950) married Carl Otto Goldick (c. 1873 – 8 July 1944) in 1897

They had a home at Somerset Place, Norwood

J(ohann) Paul Tepper (c. 1844 – 13 August 1906), pioneer farmer of Monarto, then of Murtoa, Victoria was a brother.

== Death and legacy ==
Tepper died in Norwood, South Australia, on 16 February 1923. His collections are now mostly held in Adelaide and Melbourne. His son was John William Otto Tepper (1868–1957), who collected plants at Roebuck Bay, Western Australia, and sent them to his father for identification and description; this collection is now housed principally at Perth, Western Australia.
