= Montague Rupp =

Australian clergyman and botanist

Herman Montague Rucker Rupp (27 December 1872 – 2 September 1956) was an Australian clergyman and botanist who specialised in orchids. He was known throughout his life as Montague Rupp (pronounced "Rupe") and in later life as the "Orchid Man".

Rupp was born in Port Fairy, Victoria to Charles Ludwig Hermann Rupp, a Prussian-born Anglican clergyman and Marie Ann Catherine Rupp, a Tasmanian who died two weeks after the birth of Montague. Montague Rupp was educated at Geelong Grammar School as a boarder, where an uncle John Bracebridge Wilson, the naturalist, was headmaster. Charles's parents died on the voyage to Australia or shortly before, and the boy was raised by William Frederic Augustus Rucker (1807–1882), another Prussian émigré.

Rupp was made deacon on 28 May 1899 and ordained priest on 2 June 1901. He began recording his botanical observations and specimens in 1892; from 1899 made 'a census of the native plants' of his parishes. In 1924 he decided to 'concentrate on the family which had always attracted me most — the orchids' and gave some 5000 other specimens to the University of Melbourne's botany school. He sent 'some MSS notes on orchids' to Joseph Maiden who had them published in the Australian Naturalist (April 1924). Rupp published over 200 papers in the following thirty years.

Rupp was awarded the Clarke Medal by the Royal Society of New South Wales in 1949 and the Australian Natural History Medallion by the Field Naturalists Club of Victoria in 1954.

Awards
Preceded by Arthur Bache Walkom	Clarke Medal; 1949	Succeeded by Ian Murray Mackerras
