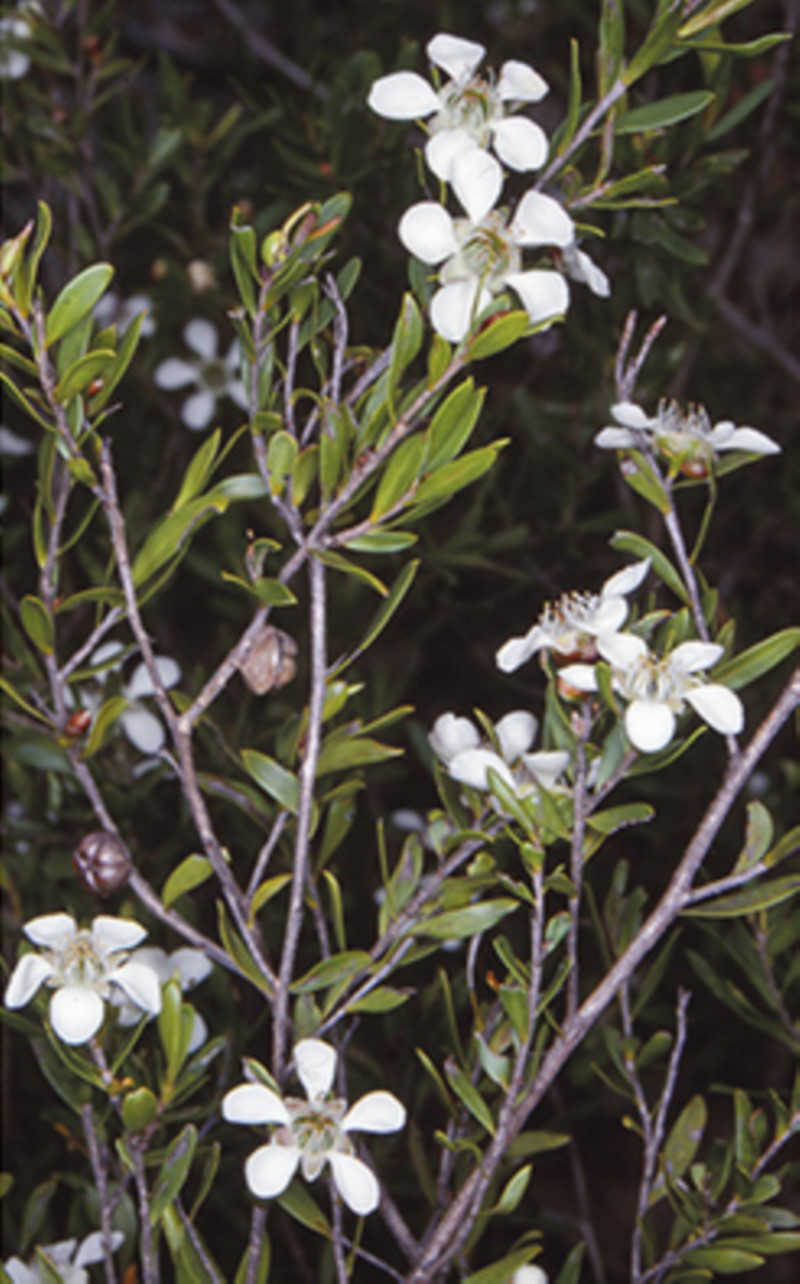
- Near Bomaderry

Scientific classification
- Kingdom: Plantae
- Clade: Tracheophytes
- Clade: Angiosperms
- Clade: Eudicots
- Clade: Rosids
- Order: Myrtales
- Family: Myrtaceae
- Genus: Leptospermum
- Species: L. sejunctum

Binomial name
- Leptospermum sejunctum Joy Thomps.

= Leptospermum sejunctum =

Species of shrub

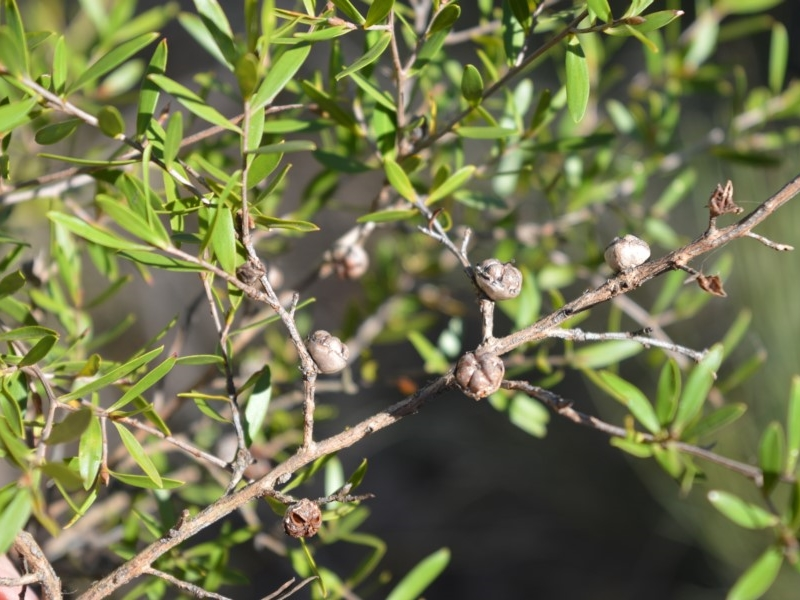
Fruit and foliage

Leptospermum sejunctum is a shrub that is endemic to the Nowra district in New South Wales. It has thin, grey bark, lance-shaped to elliptical leaves, white flowers and fruit that remain on the plant at maturity.

== Description ==
Leptospermum sejunctum is a shrub that typically grows to a height 1–1.5 m (3 ft 3 in – 4 ft 11 in). It has thin, grey bark, the younger stems more or less glabrous with a conspicuous flange. The leaves are elliptical to lance-shaped with the narrower end towards the base, 10–20 mm (0.39–0.79 in) long and 3–4 mm (0.12–0.16 in) wide with a blunt tip and tapering at the base but without a petiole. The flowers are borne singly on short side shoots from adjacent leaf axils. There are pale reddish-brown bracts and the floral cup is glabrous, about 2 mm (0.079 in) long. The sepals are broadly egg-shaped, about 2 mm (0.079 in) long and the stamens are about 2 mm (0.079 in) long. The fruit is a capsule about 8 mm (0.31 in) in diameter, the sepals having fallen off, and that remains on the plant when mature.

== Taxonomy and naming ==
Leptospermum sejunctum was first formally described in 1989 by Joy Thompson in the journal Telopea, based on plant material collected near Nowra in 1981. The species is named for its location, separate from the somewhat similar L. variabile and L. oreophilum.

== Distribution and habitat ==
This tea-tree grows in sandy soil in forest near Nowra.
