= Ilex kinabaluensis =

Conservation status
- Vulnerable (IUCN 3.1)

Scientific classification
- Kingdom: Plantae
- Clade: Tracheophytes
- Clade: Angiosperms
- Clade: Eudicots
- Clade: Asterids
- Order: Aquifoliales
- Family: Aquifoliaceae
- Genus: Ilex
- Species: I. kinabaluensis

Binomial name
- Ilex kinabaluensis S.Andrews

Species of holly

Ilex kinabaluensis is a species of tree native to Mount Kinabalu on Borneo.

== Description ==
Ilex kinabaluensis is a shrub or small tree, growing up to 2.5 meters tall.

== Range and habitat ==
Ilex kinabaluensis grows only on the southern and western flanks of Mount Kinabalu. It has a small range, and its estimated area of occupancy (AOO) and extent of occurrence (EOO) are both 20 km^{2}.

It grows in open upper montane forests and subalpine shrublands dominated by Leptospermum recurvum on ultramafic soils, from 2,130 to 2,970 meters elevation.

== Conservation ==
The species' habitat is protected within Kinabalu Park, and its range and population are not declining. The species small range makes it vulnerable to landslides, drought, fire, and other local disturbances, as well as climate change. Its conservation status is assessed as vulnerable.
