= Leptospermum amboinense =

Scientific classification
- Kingdom: Plantae
- Clade: Tracheophytes
- Clade: Angiosperms
- Clade: Eudicots
- Clade: Rosids
- Order: Myrtales
- Family: Myrtaceae
- Genus: Leptospermum
- Species: L. amboinense

Binomial name
- Leptospermum amboinense Blume
- Australian occurrence data from AVH

Synonyms
- Leptospermum annae Stein; Leptospermum flavescens var. angustifolia Ridl.; Leptospermum petersonii subsp. lanceolatum Joy Thomps.; Macklottia amboinensis (Blume) Korth.

Australian species of plant

Leptospermum amboinense is a species of tree that is native to Malesia and North Queensland. It has rough bark, sessile, narrow elliptical leaves, white flowers and sessile, conical to hemispherical fruit.

== Description ==
Leptospermum amboinense is a tree that typically grows to a height of 9 m (30 ft). It has rough, grey to brown fibrous bark on the trunk and branches. The leaves are arranged alternately, sessile, narrow elliptical, 18–30 mm (0.71–1.18 in) long and 3–5 mm (0.12–0.20 in) wide with only the midvein barely visible on the lower side. New growth is bronze-coloured. The flowers are borne singly, sometimes in groups of up to four, on side branches. The flowers are 12–18 mm (0.47–0.71 in) in diameter on a pedicel up to 1 mm (0.039 in) long with sepals that have hairy edges and white petals. Flowering occurs in summer and the fruit is a woody capsule 3–4 mm (0.12–0.16 in) long and 4–5.5 mm (0.16–0.22 in) wide with a conical or hemispherical hypanthium that has a conspicuously domed top.

== Taxonomy and naming ==
Leptospermum amboinense was first formally described in 1826 by Carl Ludwig Blume who published the description in his book Bijdragen tot de flora van Nederlandsch Indië .

== Distribution and habitat ==
This leptospermum is native to Malesia and to North Queensland. In Malesia it is found in Malaya, Sumatra, Borneo, Sulawesi, the Moluccas, Florea and the Philippines. Herbarium records suggest that in grows at lower altitudes than the similar L. javanicum. In Queensland it occurs in coastal areas between Cooktown and Bowen.

== Conservation status ==
This species is classified as of "least concern" under the Queensland Government Nature Conservation Act 1992.

== Use in horticulture ==
In cultivation, this species is a bushy shrub up to 3 m (9.8 ft) tall and 2.5 m (8 ft 2 in) wide with attractive new growth. It is hardy in the tropics and subtropical areas and can be propagated from seed or cuttings.
