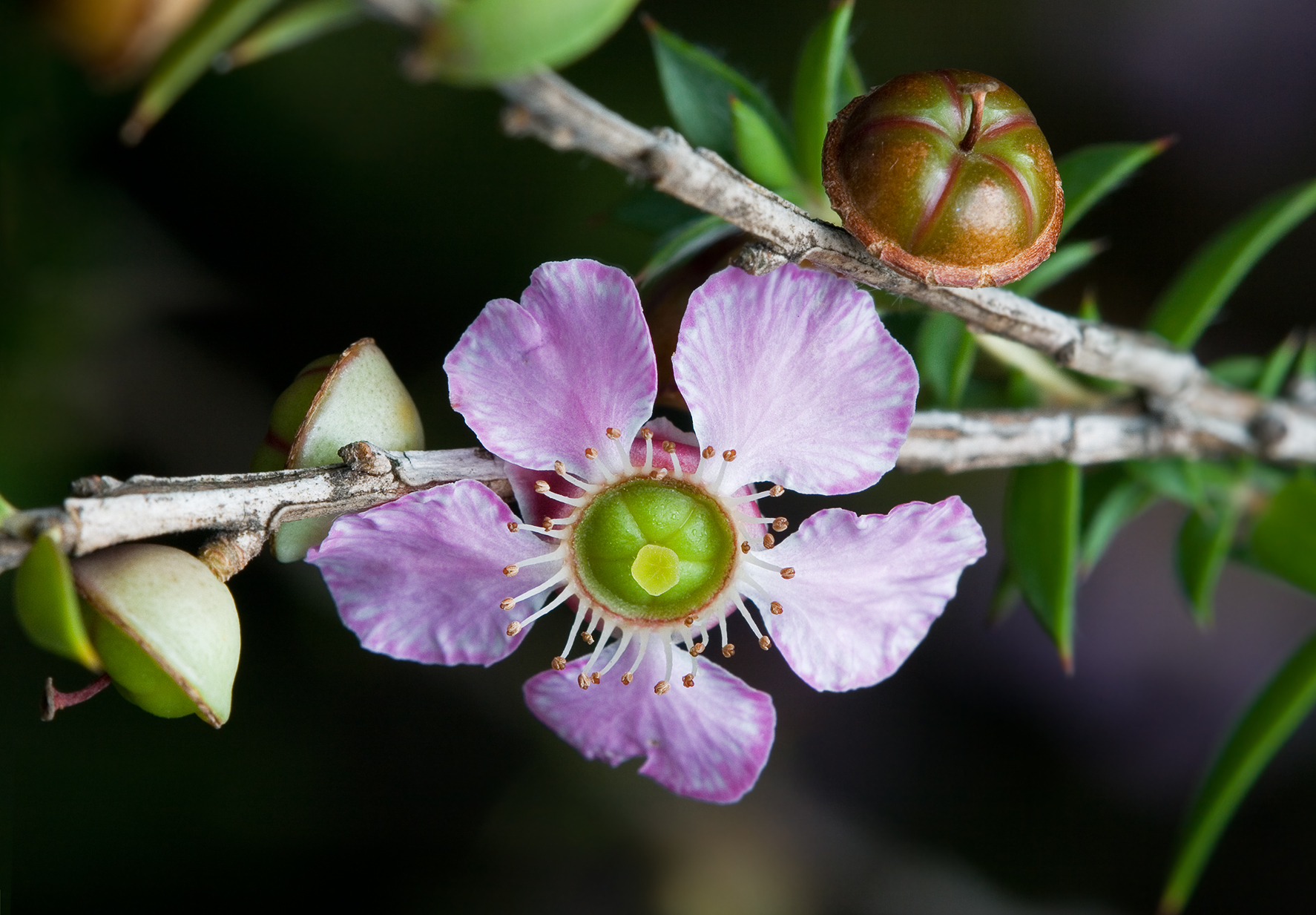
- Leptospermum squarrosum

Scientific classification
- Kingdom: Plantae
- Clade: Tracheophytes
- Clade: Angiosperms
- Clade: Eudicots
- Clade: Rosids
- Order: Myrtales
- Family: Myrtaceae
- Tribe: Leptospermeae
- Genus: Leptospermum; J.R.Forster & G.Forster

Synonyms
- Glaphyria Jack; Agonomyrtus Schauer ex Rchb.; Macklottia Korth.; Leptospermopsis S.Moore

= Leptospermum =

Genus of shrubs

Leptospermum /ˌlɛptəˈspɜːrməm, -toʊ-/ is a genus of shrubs and small trees in the myrtle family Myrtaceae commonly known as tea trees, although this name is sometimes also used for some species of Melaleuca. Most species are endemic to Australia, with the greatest diversity in the south of the continent, but some are native to other parts of the world, including New Zealand and Southeast Asia. Leptospermums all have five conspicuous petals and five groups of stamens which alternate with the petals. There is a single style in the centre of the flower and the fruit is a woody capsule.

The first formal description of a leptospermum was published in 1776 by the German botanists Johann Reinhold Forster and his son Johann Georg Adam Forster, but an unambiguous definition of individual species in the genus was not achieved until 1979. Leptospermums grow in a wide range of habitats but are most commonly found in moist, low-nutrient soils. They have important uses in horticulture, in the production of honey and in floristry.

== Description ==
Plants in the genus Leptospermum range in size from prostrate shrubs to small trees, and have fibrous, flaky or papery bark. The leaves are arranged alternately and are relatively small, rigid and often aromatic when crushed. The flowers may be solitary or in groups, and have bracteoles and sepals which in most species fall off as the flower opens. There are five spreading, conspicuous petals which are white, pink or red. There are many stamens which are usually shorter than the petals and in five groups opposite the stamens, although they often appear not to be grouped. A simple style usually arises from a small depression in the ovary which has from three to five sections in most species, each section containing a few to many ovules. The fruit is a woody capsule which opens at the top to release the seeds, although in some species this does not occur until the plant, or the part of it, dies.

== Taxonomy and naming ==
The first formal description of a leptospermum was published by Johann Reinhold Forster and Johann Georg Adam Forster in their 1776 book, Characteres Generum Plantarum. In 1876, George Bentham described twenty species, but noted the difficulty of discriminating between species. ("The species are very difficult to discriminate.") Of the species he named, only ten remain as valid.

In 1979, Barbara Briggs and Laurie Johnson published a classification of the family Myrtaceae in the Proceedings of the Linnean Society of New South Wales. Although there have been revisions to their groupings, their paper allowed a systematic examination of species in the genus Leptospermum. In 1989, Joy Thompson published a complete revision of the genus. In 2000, O'Brien et al. published yet another revision, using matK-based evidence to suggest that Leptospermum is polyphyletic, and should be split into persistent, Western non-persistent, and Eastern non-persistent fruiting plants, with Leptospermum spinescens as an outlier. However, neither phylogeny has been universally accepted. Current estimates recognize about ninety species of Leptospermum.

The common name tea tree derives from the practice of early Australian settlers who soaked the leaves of several species in boiling water to make a herbal tea. The genus name (Leptospermum) means "slender-seeded".

== Distribution and habitat ==
Most Leptospermum species are endemic to Australia where most are found in southern areas of the country. They are most common in moist, nutrient-poor soils although they sometimes occupy other situations. Leptospermum laevigatum is usually found growing on beach sand and L. riparium growing in Tasmanian rainforest on the edges of rivers. Leptospermum amboinense extends from Queensland to Southeast Asia and three species, L. javanicum, L. parviflorum and L. recurvum are endemic to southeast Asia. L. recurvum is only found on Mount Kinabalu in Sabah. Leptospermum scoparium is one of the most widespread in the genus and occurs in New South Wales, Victoria, Tasmania and New Zealand, where it is one of the most widespread and important native shrub species.

== Ecology ==
In Australia, Leptospermum species are sometimes used as food plants by the larvae of hepialid moths of the genus Aenetus, including A. lewinii and A. ligniveren. These burrow horizontally into the trunk then vertically down.

== Uses ==
=== Use in horticulture ===
Most Leptospermum species make desirable garden plants. The hardiest species (L. lanigerum, L. liversidgei, L. polygalifolium, L. rupestre, L. scoparium) are hardy to about −8 °C (18 °F) to −10 °C (14 °F); others are sensitive to frost. They tolerate most soils, but many suppliers specify ericaceous (i.e. lime-free) compost with good drainage and full sun. Established plants are drought tolerant. They are often found as hedge plants on the west coast of the United States, and some species are popular for cultivation as bonsai. Many cultivars exist.

=== Use in floristry ===
These flowers are also grown in double cultivars and are used in floral designs. However, they do not last when out of water and the single flowers do not last when wired. The 'Pacific Beauty' (Leptospermum polygalifolium) is a useful flower to use in large church-service bowls and function arrangements, however use of Leptospermum in corporate designs is less desirable as they dry and drop when subjected to heating and air conditioning.

=== Honey production ===
The nectar from the flowers is harvested by bees, yielding Leptospermum honey, which is marketed as Manuka honey. Honey produced from Australian Leptospermum polygalifolium is also known as jelly bush or the lemon-scented tea tree.

== Species ==
The following is a list of species accepted by Plants of the World Online as at August 2024:

- Leptospermum amboinense Blume - Qld, Malesia
- Leptospermum arachnoides Gaertn. spidery tea-tree - Qld, NSW
- Leptospermum argenteum Joy Thomps. Mt Royal tea-tree - NSW
- Leptospermum barneyense A.R.Bean - Qld
- Leptospermum continentale Joy Thomps. prickly tea-tree - NSW, Vic, SA
- Leptospermum crassifolium Joy Thomps. - NSW
- Leptospermum deuense Joy Thomps. - NSW
- Leptospermum emarginatum H.L.Wendl. ex Link - NSW, Vic
- Leptospermum epacridoideum Cheel - NSW
- Leptospermum glabrescens N.A.Wakef. - Vic
- Leptospermum grandiflorum Lodd. G.Lodd. & W.Lodd. - Tas
- Leptospermum grandifolium Sm. - NSW, Vic
- Leptospermum gregarium Joy Thomps. - Qld, NSW
- Leptospermum hoipolloi L.M.H.Schmid & de Lange - New Zealand
- Leptospermum javanicum Blume - Myanmar, Thailand, Malaysia, Indonesia, Philippines
- Leptospermum juniperinum Sm. - Qld, NSW
- Leptospermum lanigerum (Sol. ex Aiton) Sm. - Qld, NSW, Vic, SA, Tas
- Leptospermum liversidgei R.T.Baker & H.G.Sm. - Qld, NSW
- Leptospermum macrocarpum (Maiden & Betche) Joy Thomps. - NSW
- Leptospermum micromyrtus Miq. - NSW, Vic
- Leptospermum minutifolium C.T.White - Qld, NSW
- Leptospermum morrisonii Joy Thomps. - NSW
- Leptospermum myrtifolium Sieber ex DC. - NSW, ACT, Vic
- Leptospermum nitidum Hook.f. - Tas
- Leptospermum novae-angliae Joy Thomps. - Qld, NSW
- Leptospermum obovatum Sweet - NSW, Vic
- Leptospermum oreophilum Joy Thomps. - Qld
- Leptospermum parvifolium Sm. - Qld, NSW
- Leptospermum petersonii F.M.Bailey - Qld, NSW
- Leptospermum petraeum Joy Thomps. - NSW
- Leptospermum polygalifolium Salisb. - Qld, NSW, Lord Howe Island
  - Leptospermum polygalifolium subsp. cismontanum Joy Thomps. - Qld, NSW
  - Leptospermum polygalifolium subsp. howense Joy Thomps. - Lord Howe Island
  - Leptospermum polygalifolium subsp. montanum Joy Thomps.
  - Leptospermum polygalifolium Salisb. subsp. polygalifolium - NSW
  - Leptospermum polygalifolium subsp. transmontanum Joy Thomps. - Qld, NSW
  - Leptospermum polygalifolium subsp. tropicum Joy Thomps. - Qld
- Leptospermum recurvum Hook.f. - Sabah, Sulawesi
- Leptospermum repo de Lange & L.M.H.Schmid - New Zealand
- Leptospermum riparium D.I.Morris - Tas
- Leptospermum rotundifolium (Maiden & Betche) F.A.Rodway - NSW
- Leptospermum rupestre Hook.f. - Tas
- Leptospermum rupicola Joy Thomps. - NSW
- Leptospermum scoparium J.R.Forst. & G.Forst. - Vic, NSW, Tas, NZ
- Leptospermum sejunctum Joy Thomps. - NSW
- Leptospermum spectabile Joy Thomps. - NSW
- Leptospermum sphaerocarpum Cheel - NSW
- Leptospermum squarrosum Gaertn. - NSW
- Leptospermum tairawhitiense G.J.Atkins, de Lange & M.A.M.Renner - New Zealand
- Leptospermum thompsonii Joy Thomps. - NSW
- Leptospermum turbinatum Joy Thomps. - Vic
- Leptospermum variabile Joy Thomps. - Qld, NSW
- Leptospermum wooroonooran F.M.Bailey - Qld
