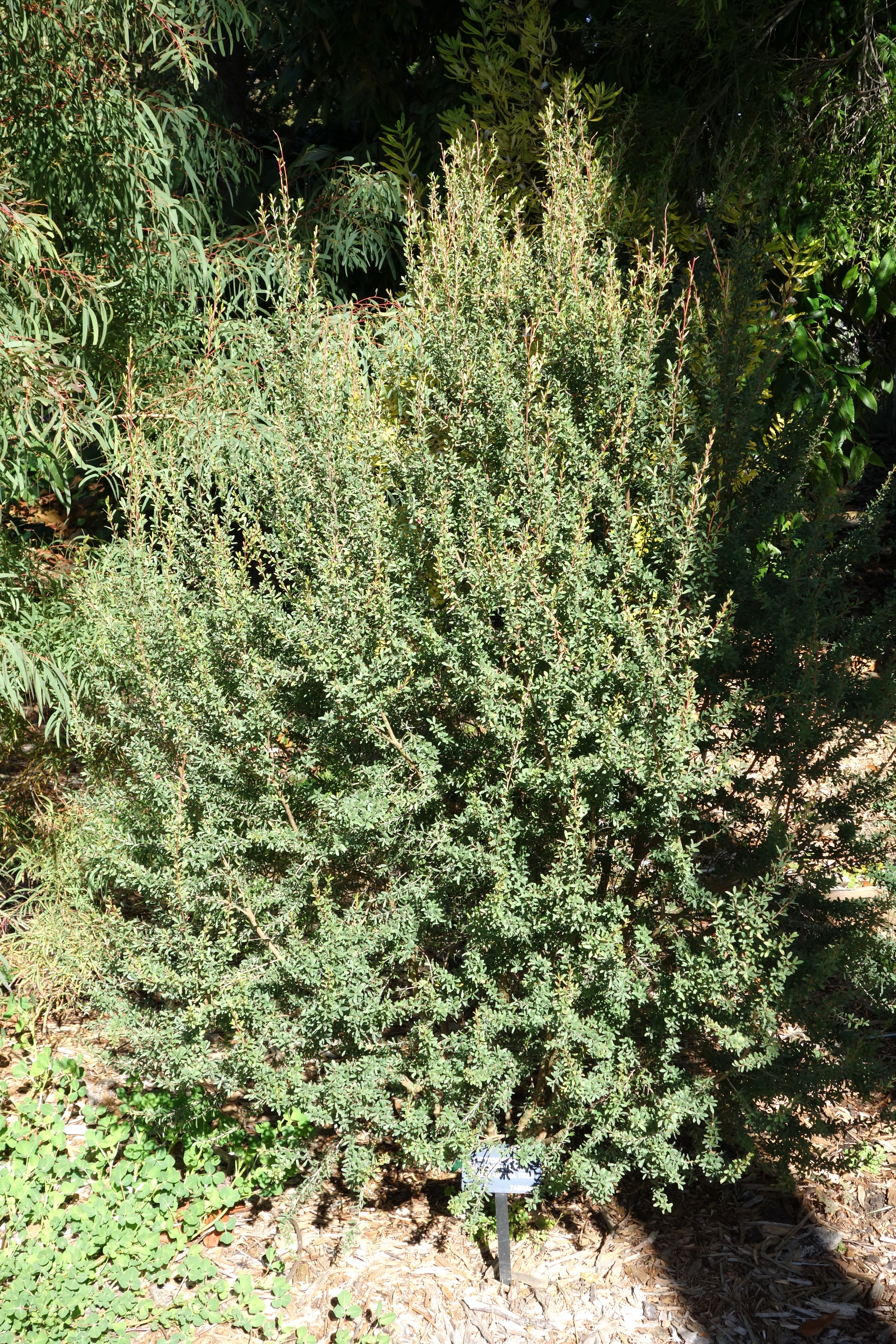

Scientific classification
- Kingdom: Plantae
- Clade: Tracheophytes
- Clade: Angiosperms
- Clade: Eudicots
- Clade: Rosids
- Order: Myrtales
- Family: Myrtaceae
- Genus: Leptospermum
- Species: L. grandiflorum

Binomial name
- Leptospermum grandiflorum Lodd. G.Lodd. & W.Lodd.

Synonyms
- List: Leptospermum flavescens f. grandiflorum (Lodd., G.Lodd. & W.Lodd.) Siebert & Voss; Leptospermum flavescens var. grandiflorum (Lodd., G.Lodd. & W.Lodd.) Benth.; Leptospermum grandiflorum Lodd., G.Lodd. & W.Lodd. var. grandiflorum; Leptospermum nobile F.Muell. ex Miq.; Leptospermum polygalifolium var. grandiflorum (Lodd., G.Lodd. & W.Lodd.) Domin; Leptospermum rodwayanum Summerh. & H.F.Comber

= Leptospermum grandiflorum =

Species of plant

Leptospermum grandiflorum is a species of shrub or small tree that is endemic to eastern Tasmania. It has thick, elliptical to egg-shaped, greyish green leaves, white flowers about 20 mm (0.79 in) in diameter arranged singly on short side branches, and fruit that remain on the plant for long time after reaching maturity.

== Description ==
Leptospermum grandiflorum is a densely-branched shrub that typically grows to a height of 1.5–5 m (4 ft 11 in – 16 ft 5 in) or more and has rough bark on older branches and whitish young stems. The leaves are thick, greyish green, elliptical to broadly egg-shaped with the narrower end towards the base, mostly 10–15 mm (0.39–0.59 in) long and 4–8 mm (0.16–0.31 in) wide, tapering to a short, often twisted petiole. The flowers are arranged singly on short side branches on a pedicel about 1 mm (0.039 in) long and are about 20 mm (0.79 in) in diameter. The floral cup is dark and wrinkled, about 3 mm (0.12 in) long and more or less glabrous. The sepals are broadly egg-shaped to round, 2.5–3.5 mm (0.098–0.138 in) long and fall off as the fruit develops. The petals are white, about 8 mm (0.31 in) long and the stamens 4–5 mm (0.16–0.20 in) long. Flowering occurs from February to April and the fruit is a capsule 9–12 mm (0.35–0.47 in) wide that remains on the plant.

== Taxonomy and naming ==
Leptospermum grandiflorum was first formally described in 1821 by the British nurserymen Joachim, George and William Loddiges in their journal, The Botanical Cabinet.

== Distribution and habitat ==
This tea-tree grows on granite rocks in eastern Tasmania, mostly on or near the Freycinet Peninsula.
