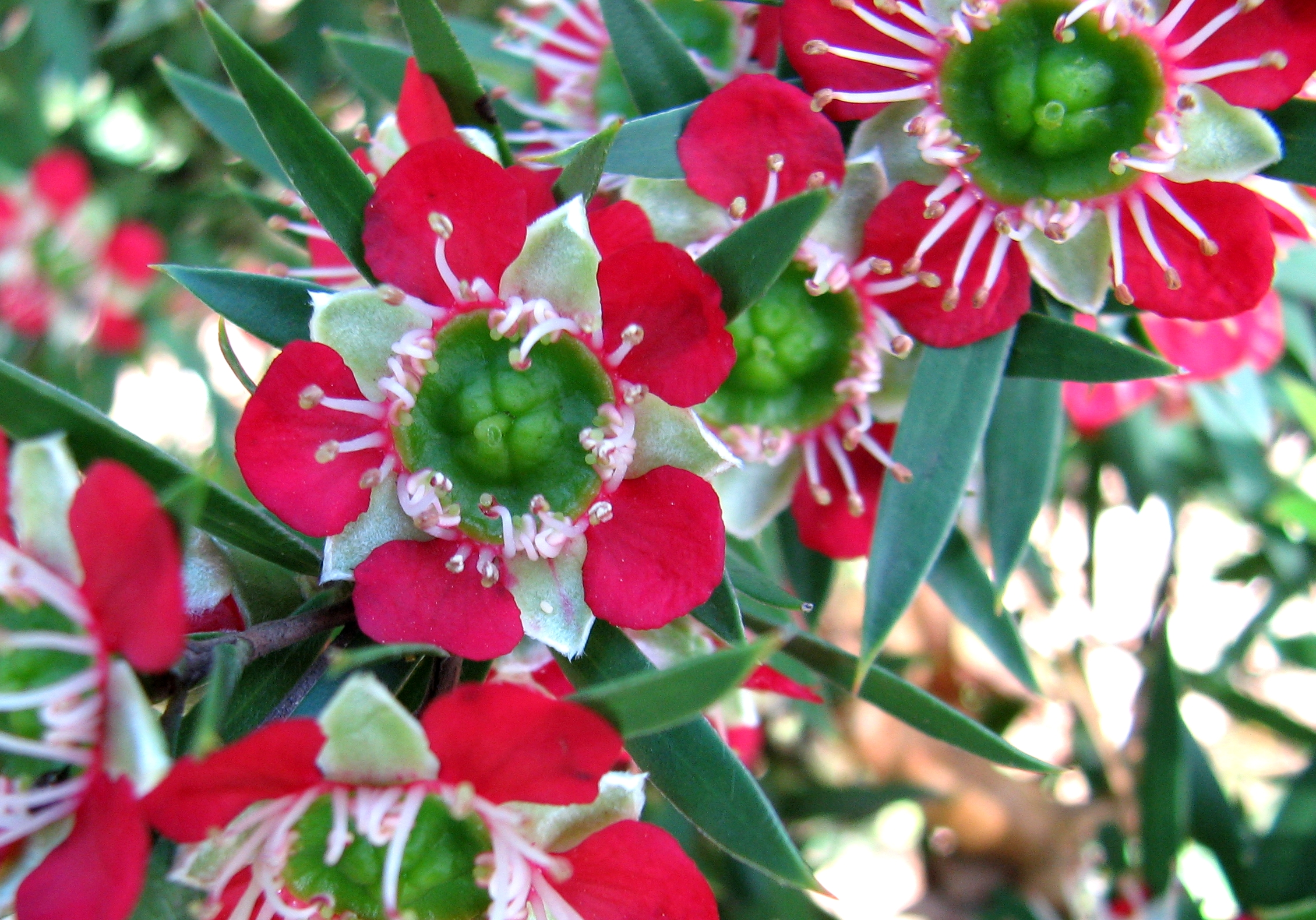

Scientific classification
- Kingdom: Plantae
- Clade: Tracheophytes
- Clade: Angiosperms
- Clade: Eudicots
- Clade: Rosids
- Order: Myrtales
- Family: Myrtaceae
- Genus: Leptospermum
- Species: L. spectabile

Binomial name
- Leptospermum spectabile Joy Thomps.

= Leptospermum spectabile =

Species of shrub

Leptospermum spectabile is a species of shrub that is endemic to a small area of New South Wales. It has thin bark, narrow elliptic leaves, dark red flowers arranged singly on short side shoots and relatively large fruit.

== Description ==
Leptospermum spectabile is a shrub that typically grows to a height of 3 m (9.8 ft) and has thin, firm bark and hairy younger stems. The leaves are narrow elliptical, 20–35 mm (0.79–1.38 in) long and 3–5 mm (0.12–0.20 in) wide, with a stiff point and tapering to a very short petiole. The flowers are dark red, about 20 mm (0.79 in) in diameter and are borne singly on short side shoots. The floral cup is densely covered with silky hairs and is about 4–5 mm (0.16–0.20 in) long, tapering to a very short pedicel or sessile. The sepals are pale, egg-shaped to oblong, about 4 mm (0.16 in) long, the petals 5–7 mm (0.20–0.28 in) long and the stamens 5–7 mm (0.20–0.28 in) long. Flowering mainly occurs from October to November and the fruit is a capsule 9–12 mm (0.35–0.47 in) in diameter with the remains of the sepals attached. The fruit remains on the plant at maturity.

== Taxonomy ==
Leptospermum spectabile was first formally described in 1989 by Joy Thompson in the journal Telopea, based on plant material collected in the Colo River gorge to the north-west of Windsor.

== Distribution and habitat ==
This teatree is only known from the Colo River, where it grows near sandstone rocks on the river bank.

== Use in horticulture ==
This species is relatively easy to grow and its red flowers make this a desirable garden feature. It grows well in most soil types but grows best in a sunny, well-drained position and is frost tolerant to −7 °C (19 °F). It is readily propagated from both seed and cuttings.
