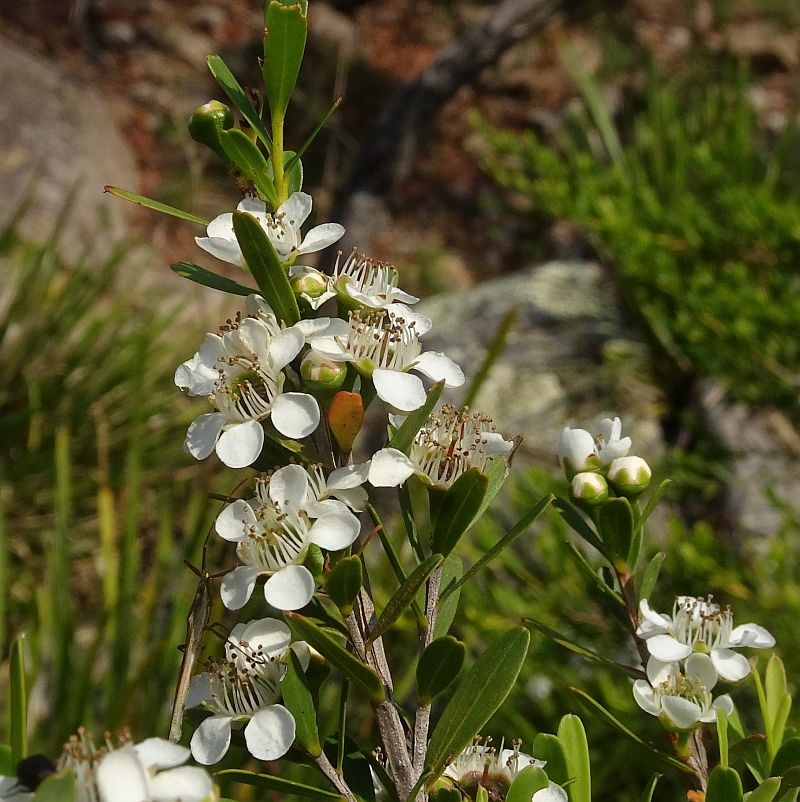
- Leptospermum emarginatum flowers and leaves

Scientific classification
- Kingdom: Plantae
- Clade: Tracheophytes
- Clade: Angiosperms
- Clade: Eudicots
- Clade: Rosids
- Order: Myrtales
- Family: Myrtaceae
- Genus: Leptospermum
- Species: L. emarginatum

Binomial name
- Leptospermum emarginatum H.L.Wendl. ex Link
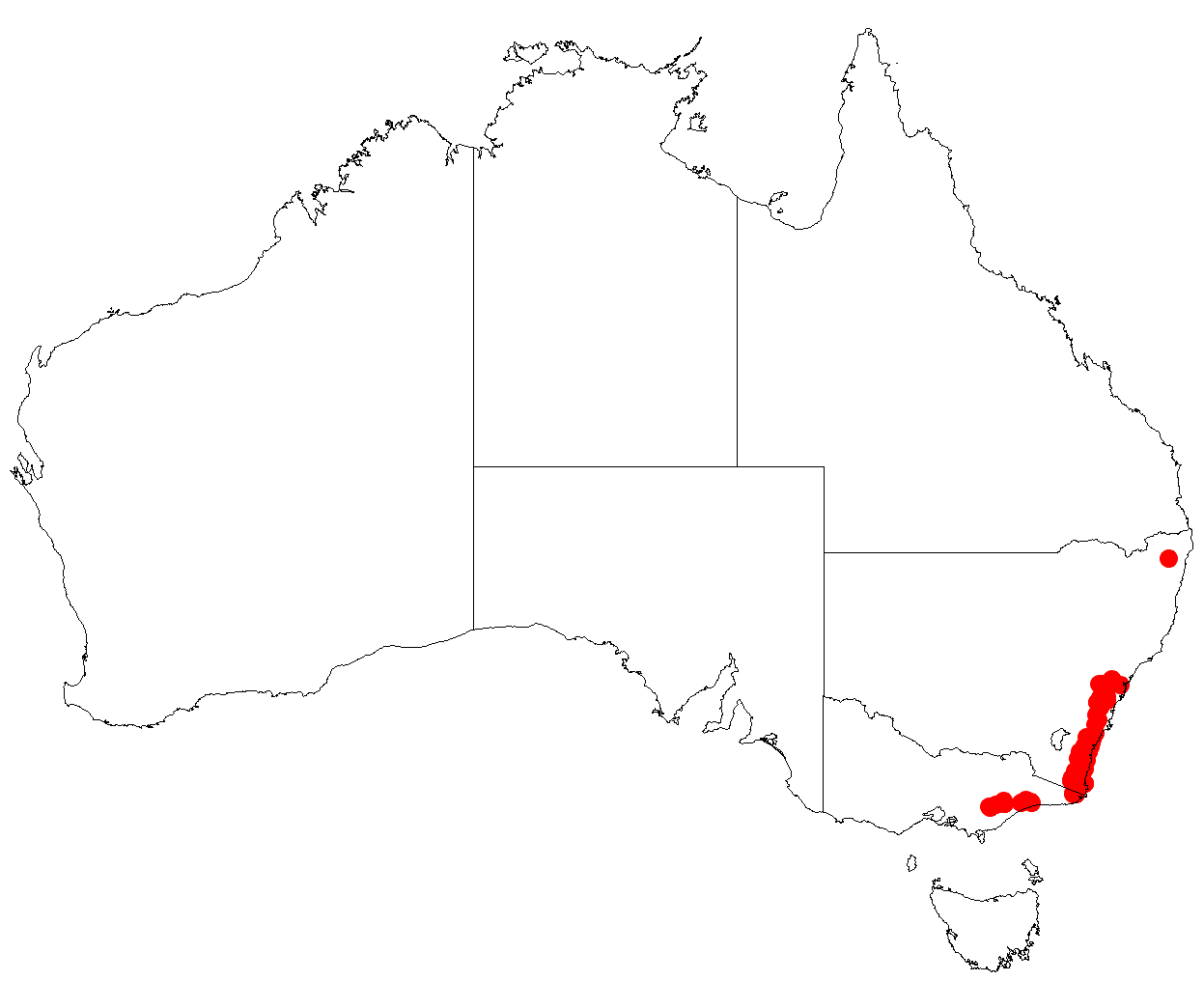
- Occurrence data from AVH

Synonyms
- Fabricia odoratum Cheel

= Leptospermum emarginatum =

Twin-flower tea-tree

Australian species of plant

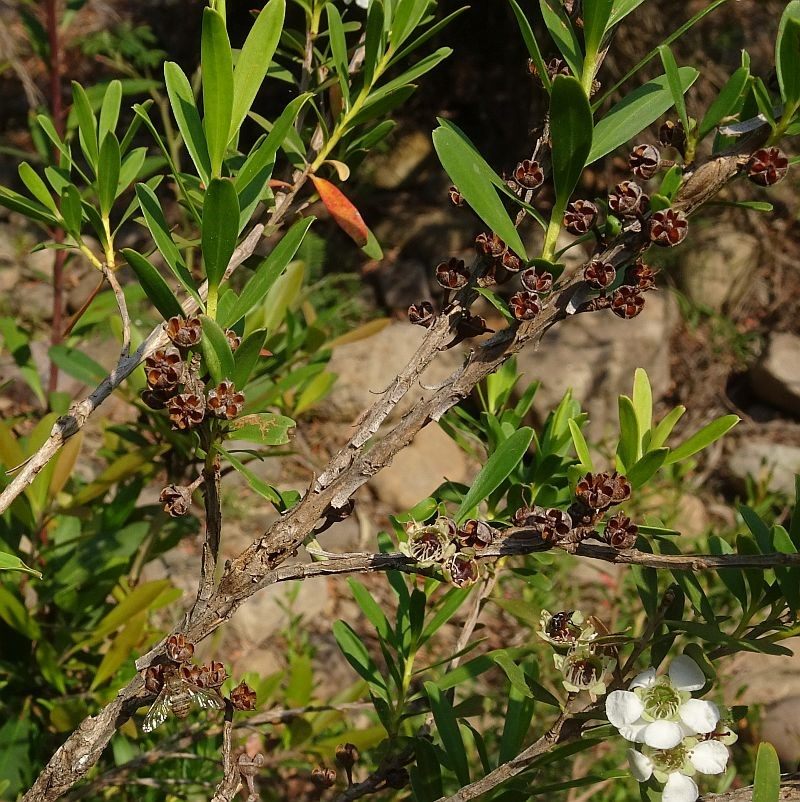
Fruit

Leptospermum emarginatum, commonly known as the twin-flower tea-tree or twin flower teatree, is a species of shrub that is endemic to south-eastern Australia. It has rough bark on the older stems, lance-shaped leaves with the narrower end towards the base and a small notch at the tip, white flowers in groups of up to five and hemispherical fruit that falls off when mature.

== Description ==
Leptospermum emarginatum is a shrub that typically grows to a height of 1.5–4 m (4 ft 11 in – 13 ft 1 in). It has rough bark that is shed in stringy strips on the larger branches and smooth bark on the younger stems. The leaves are aromatic, narrow egg-shaped to lance-shaped with the narrower end towards the base, mostly 20–30 mm (0.79–1.18 in) long and 2.5–7 mm (0.098–0.276 in) wide with a small notch at the tip. The flowers are borne in groups of up to five on short side shoots, each flower 7–9 mm (0.28–0.35 in) in diameter. The floral cup is dark-coloured, glabrous, 2–3 mm (0.079–0.118 in) long, tapering to a pedicel 3–4 mm (0.12–0.16 in) long. The sepals are triangular, 1–1.5 mm (0.039–0.059 in) long, the petals white, 3–4 mm (0.12–0.16 in) long and the stamens 2.5–4 mm (0.098–0.157 in) long in groups of about five. Flowering occurs from November to January and the fruit is a woody, hemispherical capsule 3.5–5 mm (0.14–0.20 in) wide that falls off the plant after the seeds are released.

== Taxonomy and naming ==
Leptospermum emarginatum was first formally described in 1822 by Johann Heinrich Friedrich Link from an unpublished description by Heinrich Wendland and the description was published in Link's book Enumeratio plantarum Horti regii botanici berolinensis altera. The specific epithet (emarginatum) is from Latin meaning "notched".

== Distribution and habitat ==
The twin-flower tea-tree grows along river banks and rocky creeks in coastal areas south from the Grose River in New South Wales to near Heyfield in Victoria.
