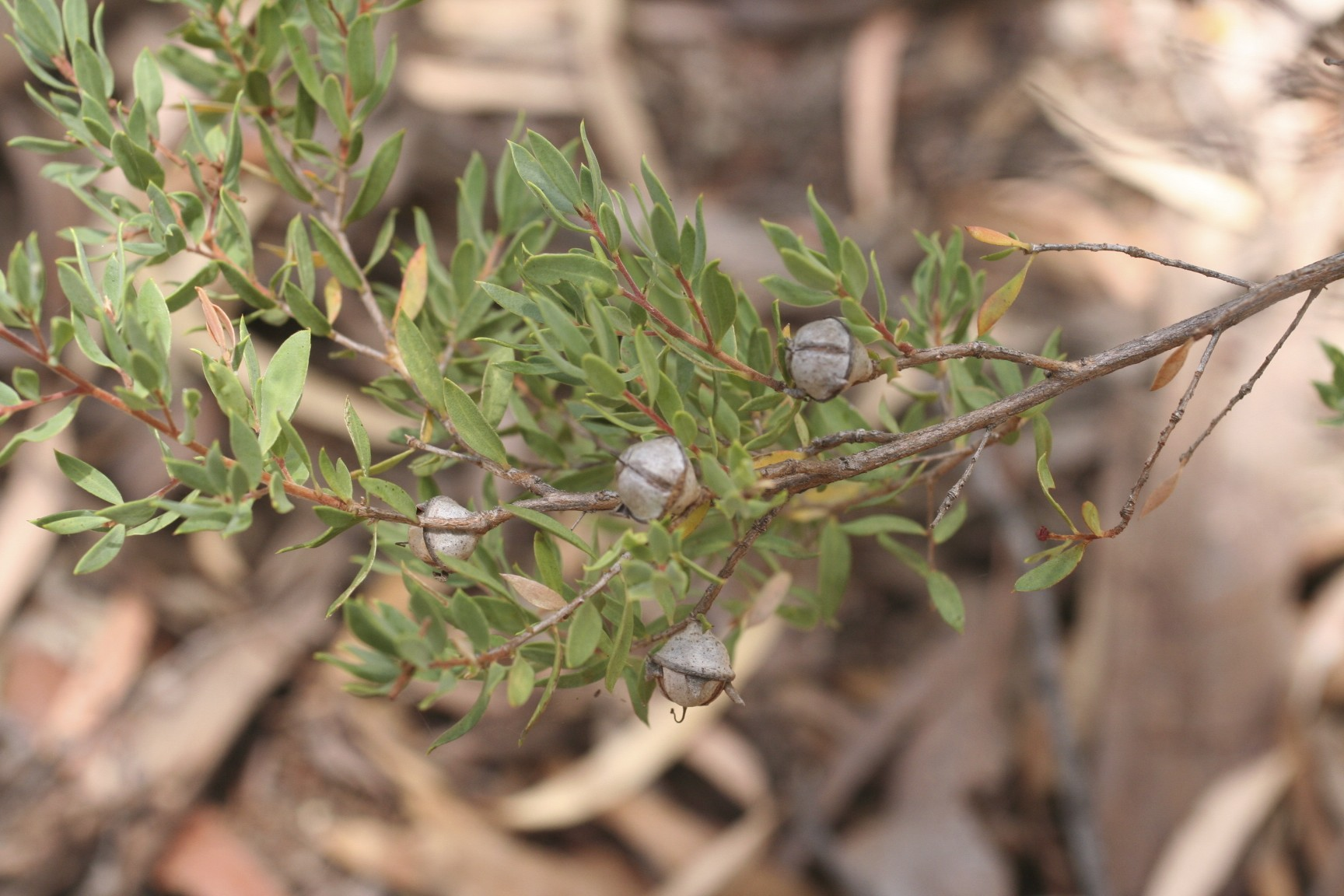
- Foliage and fruit

Scientific classification
- Kingdom: Plantae
- Clade: Embryophytes
- Clade: Tracheophytes
- Clade: Angiosperms
- Clade: Eudicots
- Clade: Rosids
- Order: Myrtales
- Family: Myrtaceae
- Genus: Leptospermum
- Species: L. sphaerocarpum

Binomial name
- Leptospermum sphaerocarpum Cheel

= Leptospermum sphaerocarpum =

Species of shrub

Leptospermum sphaerocarpum is a species of shrub that is endemic to New South Wales. It has thin, firm bark, elliptical, sharply-pointed leaves, greenish white or pink flowers and fruit that remain on the plant at maturity.

== Description ==
Leptospermum sphaerocarpum is a shrub that typically grows to a height of 2 m (6 ft 7 in) with thin, firm bark and young stems usually covered with soft hairs. It has broad to narrow elliptical leaves 5–10 mm (0.20–0.39 in) long and 2–5 mm (0.079–0.197 in) wide with a sharply-pointed tip and tapering at the base to a short, thick petiole. The flowers are greenish white or pink, mostly 15–20 mm (0.59–0.79 in) wide and arranged singly on short side shoots. There are many reddish brown bracts at the base of the flower bud but which fall off long before the flower opens. The floral cup is densely silky-hairy, 3.5–5 mm (0.14–0.20 in) long and the sepals broadly egg-shaped, about 3.5–5 mm (0.14–0.20 in) long. The petals are 5–7 mm (0.20–0.28 in) long and the stamens 4–6 mm (0.16–0.24 in) long. Flowering mainly occurs from October to November and the fruit is a capsule 7–10 mm (0.28–0.39 in) wide with woody valves and that remains on the plant at maturity.

== Taxonomy and naming ==
Leptospermum sphaerocarpum was first formally described in 1932 by Edwin Cheel in the Journal and Proceedings of the Royal Society of New South Wales, from specimens he collected near Rylstone.

== Distribution and habitat ==
This tea-tree in grows in heath and forest on sandstone ridges and cliffs In the Warrumbungles and south to the Blue Mountains and upper Hunter River in New South Wales.
