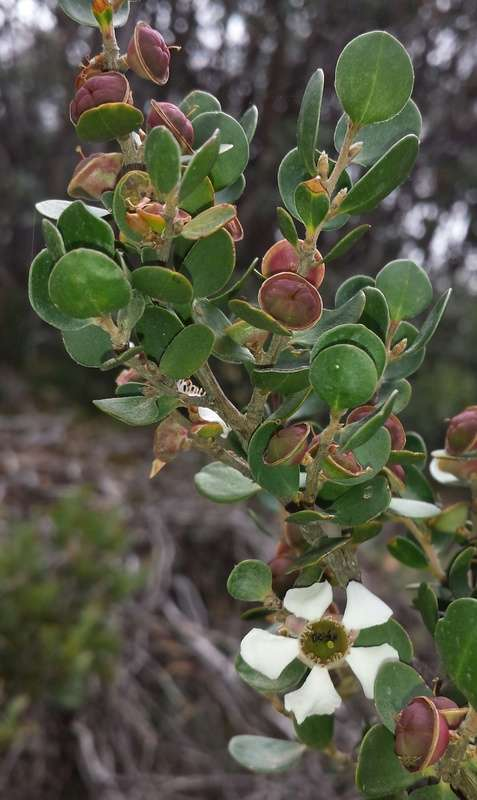
- Leptospermum micromyrtus in the Mount Buffalo National Park

Scientific classification
- Kingdom: Plantae
- Clade: Tracheophytes
- Clade: Angiosperms
- Clade: Eudicots
- Clade: Rosids
- Order: Myrtales
- Family: Myrtaceae
- Genus: Leptospermum
- Species: L. micromyrtus

Binomial name
- Leptospermum micromyrtus Miq.

= Leptospermum micromyrtus =

Button tea-tree

Species of shrub

Leptospermum micromyrtus is a species of spreading shrub that is endemic to higher areas of south-eastern Australia. It has broad, egg-shaped leaves with the narrower end towards the base, white flowers and fruit that remain on the plant at maturity.

== Description ==
Leptospermum micromyrtus is a shrub that typically grows to a height of 1–3 m (3 ft 3 in – 9 ft 10 in). It has papery bark tending to rough and peeling in flakes. The leaves are egg-shaped to broadly egg-shaped with the narrower end towards the base, sometimes almost round, mostly 10–15 mm (0.39–0.59 in) long and 5–10 mm (0.20–0.39 in) wide on a short petiole. The flowers are white, 12–15 mm (0.47–0.59 in) wide and usually arranged singly, sometimes in pairs on a short side shoot. There are broad reddish brown bracts at the base of the flower bud but which fall off as the flower opens. The floral cup is dark-coloured and glabrous, 2–4 mm (0.079–0.157 in) long on a pedicel up to 1 mm (0.039 in) long. The sepals are triangular, 2.5–3 mm (0.098–0.118 in) long, the petals 5–6 mm (0.20–0.24 in) long and the stamens 1.5–2.5 mm (0.059–0.098 in) long. Flowering mainly occurs from December to March, mainly January to February and the fruit is a broadly hemispherical capsule 5–9 mm (0.20–0.35 in) wide remaining on the plant at maturity and finally becoming fissured.

== Taxonomy and naming ==
Leptospermum micromyrtus was first formally described in 1856 by Friedrich Anton Wilhelm Miquel in the journal Nederlandsch Kruidkundig Archief from a specimen collected by Ferdinand von Mueller on "Mount Aberdeen" (an old name for Mount Buffalo). The specific epithet (micromyrtus) is derived from the ancient Greek word mikros and the genus name Myrtus.

== Distribution and habitat ==
Button tea-tree grows on steep, windswept, rocky slopes south from the Brindabella Range in New South Wales to scattered mountain summits in Victoria, including Mount Buffalo and Mount Cobberas.
