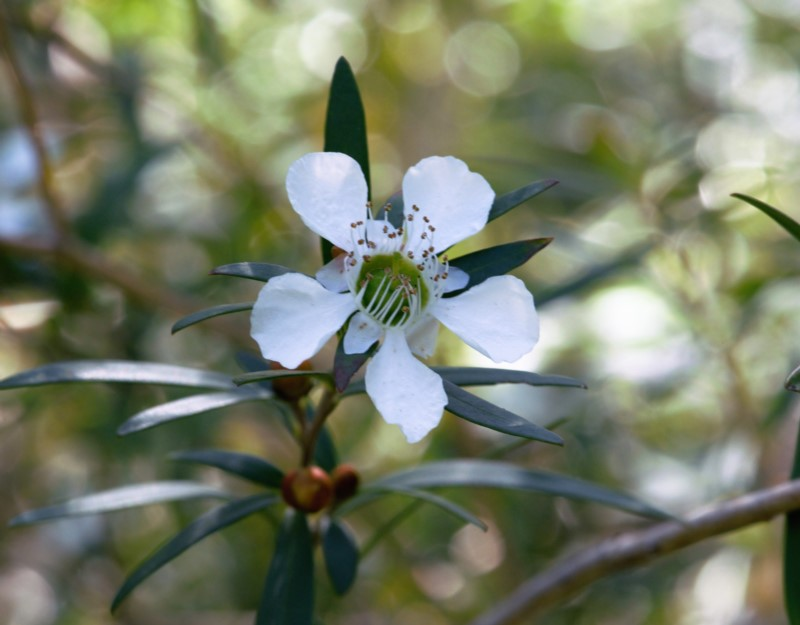
- In Mollymook

Scientific classification
- Kingdom: Plantae
- Clade: Tracheophytes
- Clade: Angiosperms
- Clade: Eudicots
- Clade: Rosids
- Order: Myrtales
- Family: Myrtaceae
- Genus: Leptospermum
- Species: L. morrisonii

Binomial name
- Leptospermum morrisonii Joy Thomps.

Synonyms
- Leptospermum virgatum S.Schauer nom. illeg.

= Leptospermum morrisonii =

Species of shrub

Leptospermum morrisonii is a shrub or small tree that is endemic to New South Wales. It has strongly aromatic, elliptical to lance-shaped or curved leaves, white or greenish white flowers and fruit that remain on the plant. It occurs in the south-east of the state.

== Description ==
Leptospermum morrisonii is a shrub or small tree that typically grows to a height of 2–5 m (6 ft 7 in – 16 ft 5 in) or higher. The bark on older stems is corrugated, the younger stems softly-hairy with a distinct flange. The leaves are strongly aromatic, elliptical to lance-shaped with the narrower end towards the base and often slightly curved, 15–35 mm (0.59–1.38 in) long and 2–8 mm (0.079–0.315 in) wide with a negligible petiole. The flowers are borne singly on the ends of branchlets and are white or greenish creamy-white, usually 12–15 mm (0.47–0.59 in) wide. There are broad, reddish brown bracts and bracteoles at the base of the flower bud but most are shed before the flower opens. The floral cup is glabrous, about 4 mm (0.16 in) deep and the sepals are thin, pale, and 2.5–3.5 mm (0.098–0.138 in) long. The petals are 5–7 mm (0.20–0.28 in) long and the stamens 3.5–4.5 mm (0.14–0.18 in) long. Flowering mainly occurs from late December to January and the fruit is a capsule usually 6–10 mm (0.24–0.39 in) in diameter.

== Taxonomy and naming ==
Leptospermum morrisonii was first formally described in 1989 by Joy Thompson in the journal Telopea, based on plant material collected by Hugo Salasoo, near Mount Dhruwalgha, south-east of Robertson. The specific epithet (morrisonii) honours David Morrison for his genecological work.

== Distribution and habitat ==
This tea-tree grows in woodland and shrubland in rocky paces and on rocky creek banks from the southern Blue Mountains to the Corang River further south.
