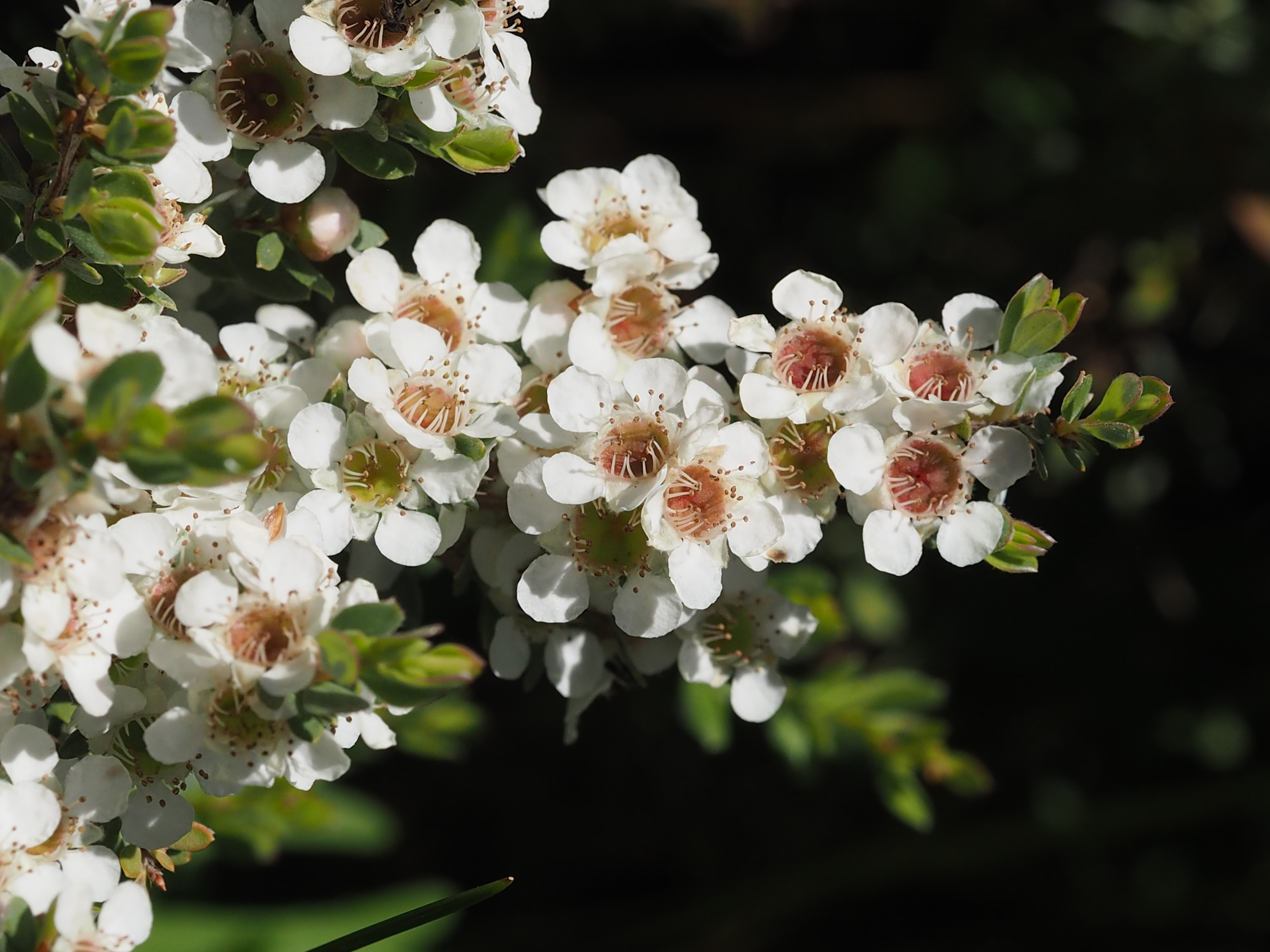
- Leptospermum minutifolium in Cathedral Rock National Park

Scientific classification
- Kingdom: Plantae
- Clade: Embryophytes
- Clade: Tracheophytes
- Clade: Spermatophytes
- Clade: Angiosperms
- Clade: Eudicots
- Clade: Rosids
- Order: Myrtales
- Family: Myrtaceae
- Genus: Leptospermum
- Species: L. minutifolium

Binomial name
- Leptospermum minutifolium C.T.White

Synonyms
- Leptospermum flavescens var. minutifolium F.Muell. ex Benth.; Leptospermum polygalifolium var. minutifolium (F.Muell. ex Benth.) Domin

= Leptospermum minutifolium =

Small-leaved tea-tree

Species of shrub

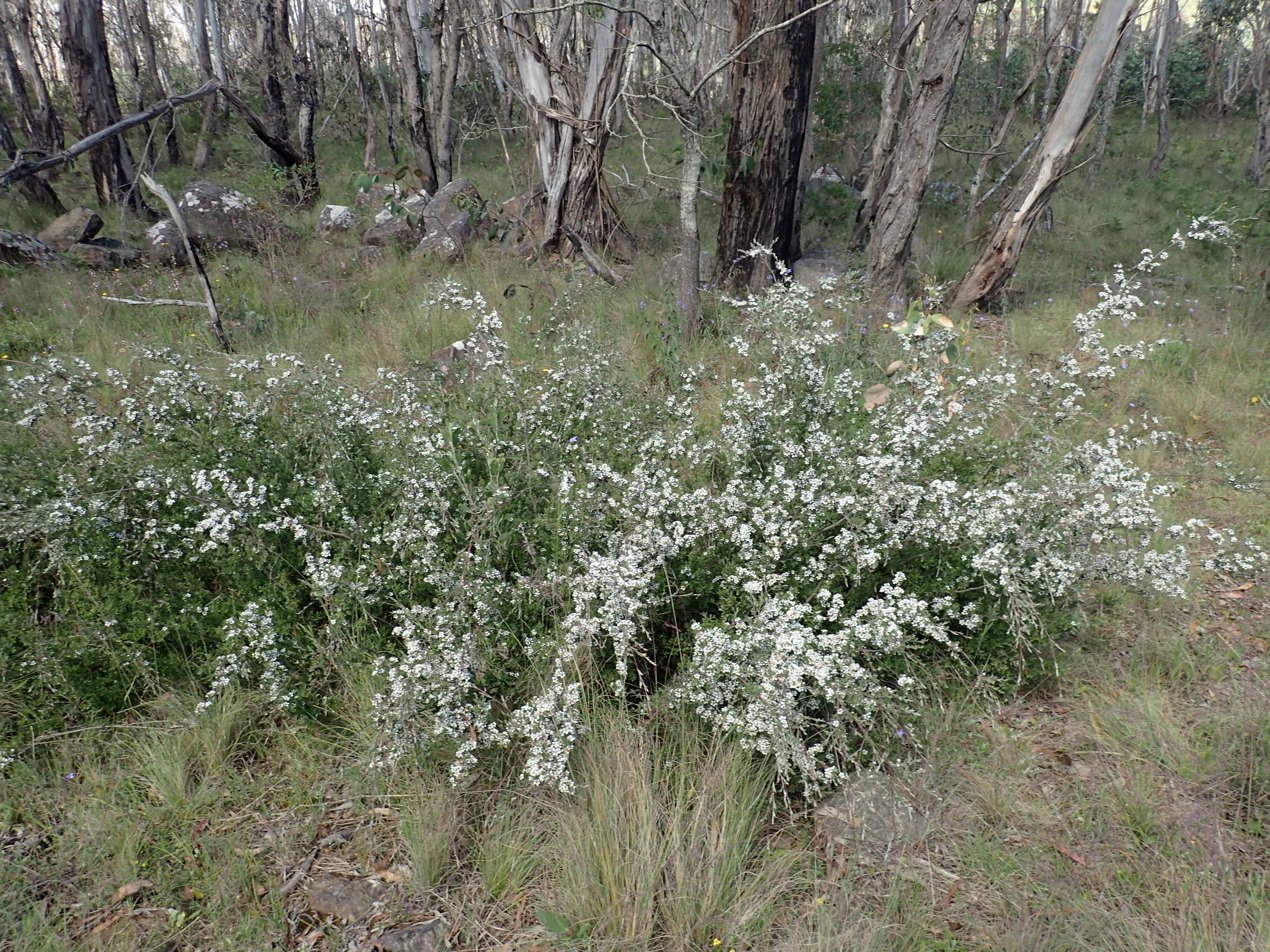
Habit

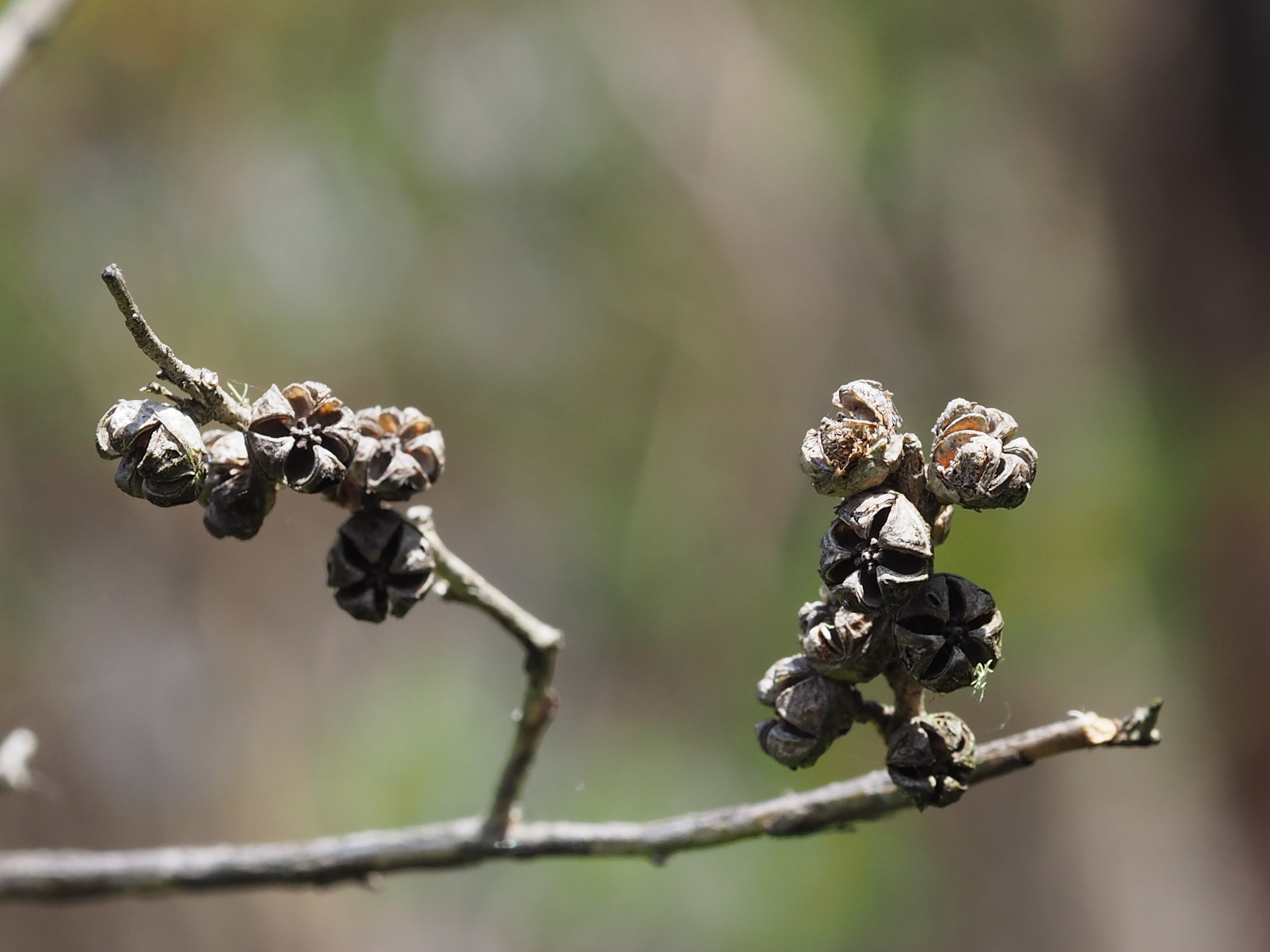
Fruit

Leptospermum minutifolium, commonly known as small-leaved tea-tree, is a species of shrub that is endemic to eastern Australia. It has relatively small egg-shaped leaves, white flowers borne singly on the ends of branches and fruit that remains on the plant.

== Description ==
Leptospermum minutifolium is a shrub that typically grows to a height of 1–2 m (3 ft 3 in – 6 ft 7 in). It has variable bark, sometimes thin and rough, otherwise smooth and flaking. The leaves are egg-shaped with the narrower end towards the base, usually 2–4 mm (0.079–0.157 in) long but sometimes up to 7 mm (0.28 in) long, and about 2 mm (0.079 in) wide. The flowers are white, about 8 mm (0.31 in) wide and arranged singly on the ends of short side shoots. The floral cup is glabrous, 2–3 mm (0.079–0.118 in) long, the sepals 1.5–2 mm (0.059–0.079 in) long, the petals 2.5–3 mm (0.098–0.118 in) long and the stamens 3–3.5 mm (0.12–0.14 in) long. Flowering mainly occurs from October to November and the fruit is a capsule 5–7 mm (0.20–0.28 in) wide that remains on the plant at maturity.

== Taxonomy and naming ==
Leptospermum minutifolium was first formally described in 1946 by Cyril Tenison White in the Proceedings of the Royal Society of Queensland from specimens collected by "Mrs. M.S. Clemens" near Wallangarra.

== Distribution and habitat ==
Small-leaved tea-tree grows in swamps and on rocky creek banks on the Northern Tablelands of New South Wales and the Granite Belt of south-east Queensland.
