= Leptospermum riparium =

Riverine tea-tree

Scientific classification
- Kingdom: Plantae
- Clade: Tracheophytes
- Clade: Angiosperms
- Clade: Eudicots
- Clade: Rosids
- Order: Myrtales
- Family: Myrtaceae
- Genus: Leptospermum
- Species: L. riparium

Binomial name
- Leptospermum riparium D.I.Morris

Species of shrub

Leptospermum riparium, commonly known as riverine tea-tree, is a species of straggling shrub that is endemic to Tasmania. It has flaky bark, crowded, lance-shaped leaves with the narrower end towards the base, relatively large white flowers and fruit that remain on the plant when mature. It grows on river banks in rainforest.

== Description ==
Leptospermum riparium is a straggly shrub that typically grows to a height of 3 m (9.8 ft) or more and has flaky bark. The leaves are mostly glabrous, lance-shaped with the narrower end towards the base, usually 10–25 mm (0.39–0.98 in) long, 2–4 mm (0.079–0.157 in) wide, the base tapering to a thin petiole. The flowers are white, 15–20 mm (0.59–0.79 in) wide and arranged on the ends of leafy side branches. There are reddish-brown bracts and bracteoles at the base of the flower buds but that usually fall off before the flower opens. The floral cup is about 4 mm (0.16 in) long with triangular sepals about 4 mm (0.16 in) long. The petals are 8 or 9 mm (0.31 or 0.35 in) long and the stamens about 4 m (13 ft) long. Flowering mainly occurs in January and the fruit is a capsule 6–8 mm (0.24–0.31 in) wide with the remains of the sepals attached and that remains on the plant at maturity.

== Taxonomy and naming ==
Leptospermum riparium was first formally described in 1974 by Tasmanian botanist Dennis Ivor Morris in Records of the Queen Victoria Museum, based on specimens he collected near the bridge over the Huon River in the Tahune Forest Park. The specific epithet (riparium) is from a Latin word meaning "inhabiting river banks".

== Distribution and habitat ==
The riverine tea-tree grows along major rivers in rainforest of southern and eastern Tasmania.
