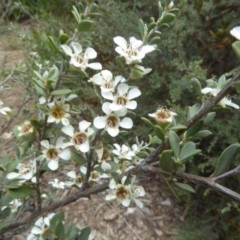
- Leptospermum myrtifolium in the Molonglo Valley

Scientific classification
- Kingdom: Plantae
- Clade: Tracheophytes
- Clade: Angiosperms
- Clade: Eudicots
- Clade: Rosids
- Order: Myrtales
- Family: Myrtaceae
- Genus: Leptospermum
- Species: L. myrtifolium

Binomial name
- Leptospermum myrtifolium Sieber ex DC.

Synonyms
- Leptospermum cunninghami S.Schauer orth. var.; Leptospermum cunninghamii S.Schauer; Leptospermum pubescens var. parviflorum Domin; Leptospermum thymifolium A.Cunn. nom. illeg.

= Leptospermum myrtifolium =

Myrtle tea-tree

Australian species of plant

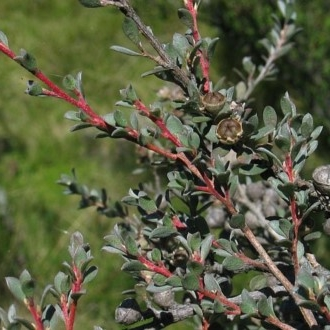
Fruit

Leptospermum myrtifolium, commonly known as the myrtle tea-tree or grey tea-tree, is a species of shrub that is endemic to south eastern Australia. It has broad egg-shaped to elliptical leaves, white flowers usually borne singly on short side shoots, and fruit that remains on the plant until it dies.

== Description ==
Leptospermum myrtifolium is a shrub that typically grows to a height of 1–3 m (3 ft 3 in – 9 ft 10 in). It has thin, rough bark that is shed in flaky layers on the older stems and young stems that are softly-hairy at first. The leaves are broadly egg-shaped to elliptical, 5–10 mm (0.20–0.39 in) long and 2–5 mm (0.079–0.197 in) wide, tapering to a thin petiole about 1 mm (0.039 in) long. The flowers are borne singly, sometimes in pairs, on short side shoots, and are white and 7–10 mm (0.28–0.39 in) wide. There are broad reddish brown bracts at the base of the flower bud but which fall off well before the flower opens. The floral cup is mostly glabrous, 2–3 mm (0.079–0.118 in) long on a thin pedicel about 1 mm (0.039 in) long. The sepals are broadly egg-shaped, about 2 mm (0.079 in) long, the petals 3–3.5 mm (0.12–0.14 in) long and the stamens 1.5–2 mm (0.059–0.079 in) long. Flowering mainly occurs from January to February and the fruit is a hemispherical capsule 4–6 mm (0.16–0.24 in) wide that remains on the plant until it dies.

== Taxonomy and naming ==
Leptospermum myrtifolium was first formally described in 1825 by Augustin Pyramus de Candolle in his book Prodromus Systematis Naturalis Regni Vegetabilis from an unpublished description by Franz Sieber. The specific epithet (myrtifolium) is from Latin words meaning "myrtle-leaved".

== Distribution and habitat ==
Myrtle tea-tree usually grows in poorly-drained soils in woodland, on the edges of high altitude swamps and along rocky creek banks. It occurs south from the Orange district in New South Wales to eastern Victoria.
