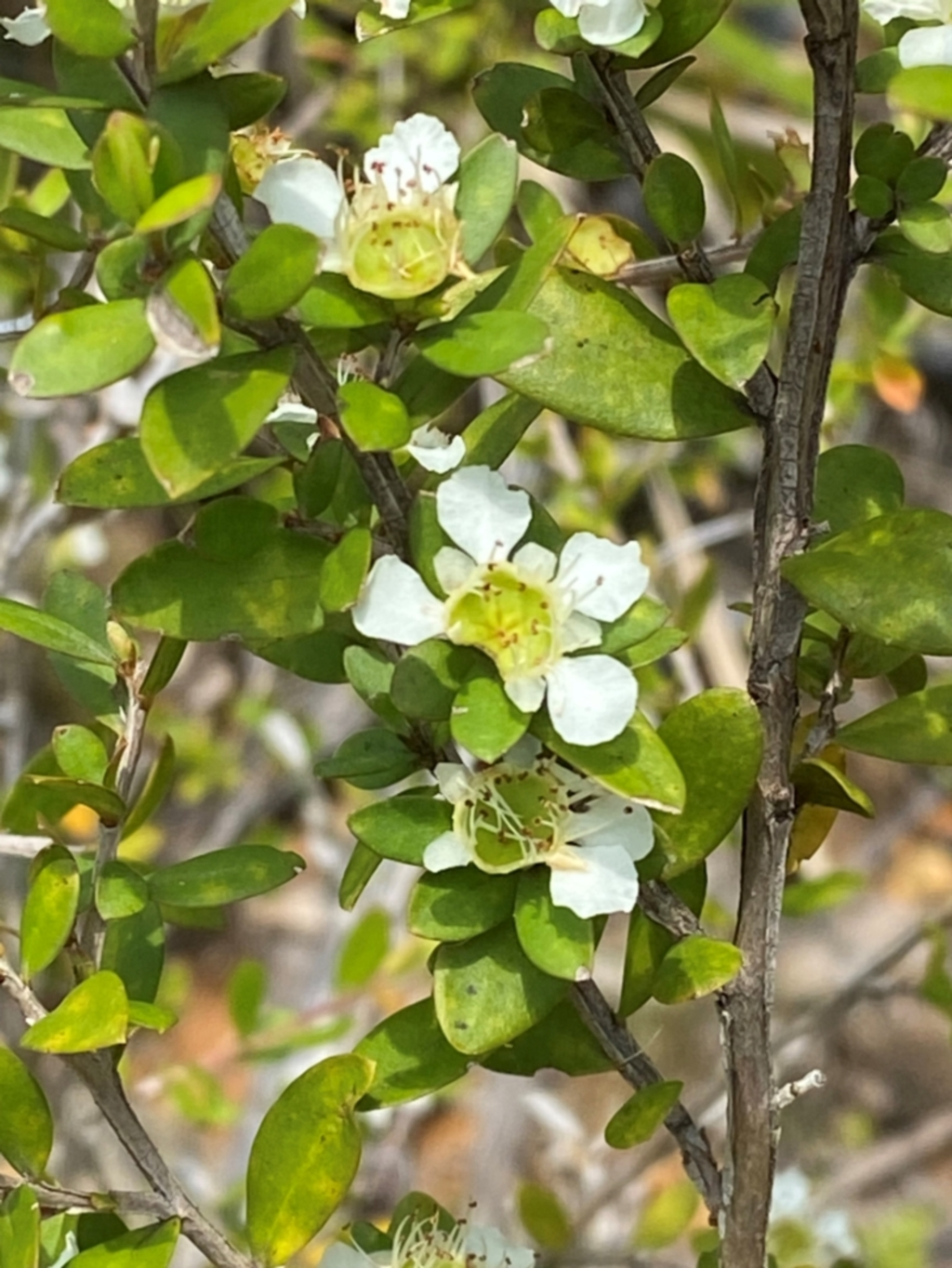

Scientific classification
- Kingdom: Plantae
- Clade: Tracheophytes
- Clade: Angiosperms
- Clade: Eudicots
- Clade: Rosids
- Order: Myrtales
- Family: Myrtaceae
- Genus: Leptospermum
- Species: L. argenteum

Binomial name
- Leptospermum argenteum Joy Thomps.
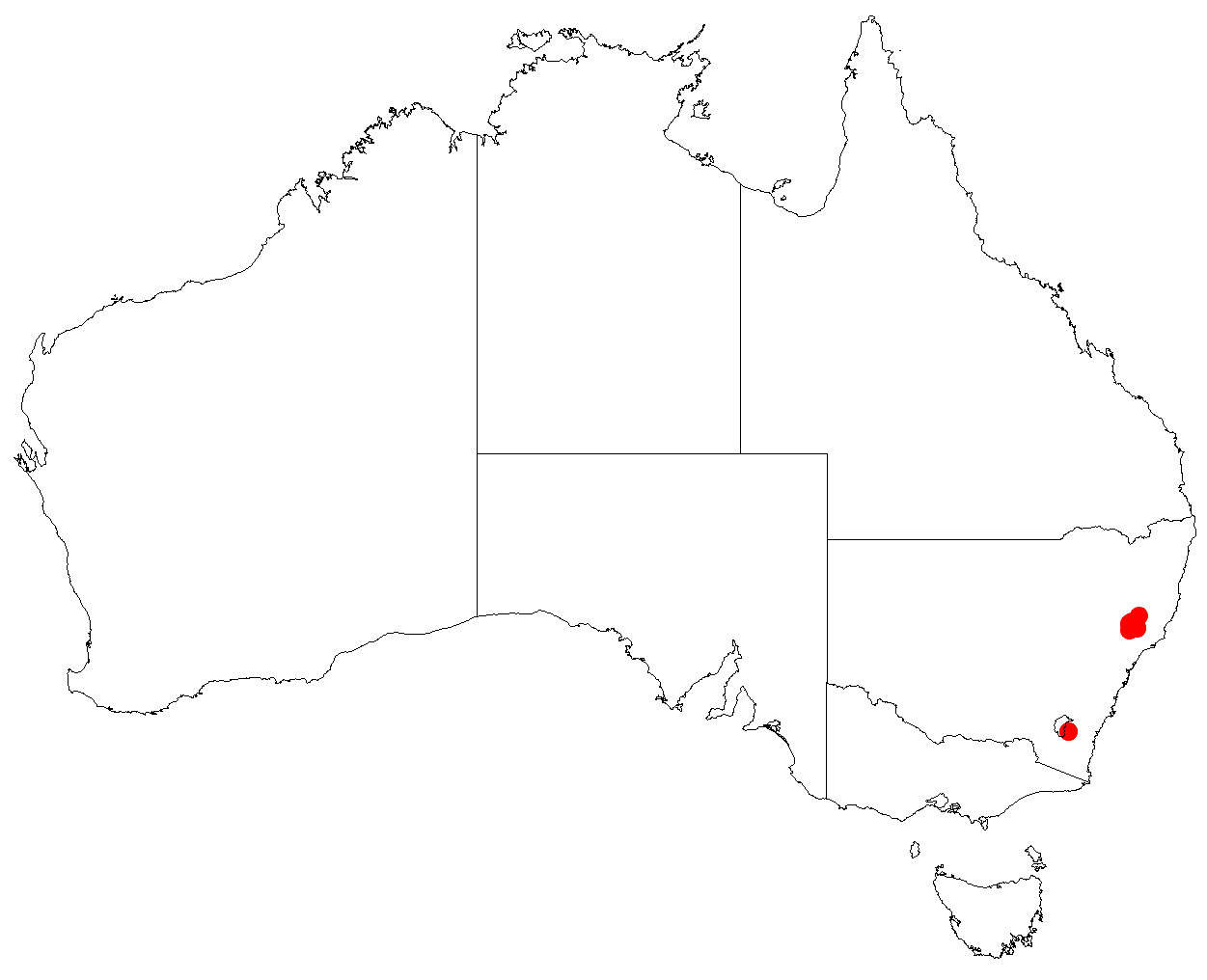
- Occurrence data from AVH

= Leptospermum argenteum =

Mt Royal tea-tree

Australian species of plant

Leptospermum argenteum, commonly known as the Mt Royal tea-tree, is a species of shrub that is endemic to the higher parts of Barrington Tops in New South Wales. It has smooth bark, stems with a flange along the sides, broad leaves, white flowers and unlike many others in the genus, it is never lemon-scented.

== Description ==
Leptospermum argenteum is a shrub that typically grows to a height of 7 m (23 ft) and is never lemon-scented. It has smooth bark that is shed in strips or flakes. Young stems are densely hairy at first and have a conspicuous flange, especially near the base of the leaves. The leaves are broadly egg-shaped to elliptical, 5–15 mm (0.20–0.59 in) long and 2.5–7.5 mm (0.098–0.295 in) wide with a short petiole. The flowers are usually borne singly in leaf axils and are 8–12 mm (0.31–0.47 in) in diameter on a densely hairy pedicel about 1 mm (0.039 in) long. The floral cup is glabrous and 2–3 mm (0.079–0.118 in) long. The sepals are about 2 mm (0.079 in) long and broadly egg-shaped to almost spherical and fall off as the flower develops. The petals 4–5 mm (0.16–0.20 in) long and white. The stamens are 2–3 mm (0.079–0.118 in) long and bundled into groups of about five. Flowering mainly occurs in January and the fruit is a woody capsule 5–7 mm (0.20–0.28 in) in diameter.

== Taxonomy and naming ==
Leptospermum argenteum was first formally described in 1989 by Joy Thompson in the journal Telopea. The specific epithet (argenteum) is from Latin argenteus, meaning "silvery in colour", referring to the colour of the new growth.

== Distribution and habitat ==
Mt Royal tea-tree grows in forest and woodland, along streams and in swamps in the Barrington Tops area, including the Barrington Tops and Mount Royal National Parks and the Stewarts Brook State Forest.
