= Leptospermum crassifolium =

Scientific classification
- Kingdom: Plantae
- Clade: Tracheophytes
- Clade: Angiosperms
- Clade: Eudicots
- Clade: Rosids
- Order: Myrtales
- Family: Myrtaceae
- Genus: Leptospermum
- Species: L. crassifolium

Binomial name
- Leptospermum crassifolium Joy Thomps.
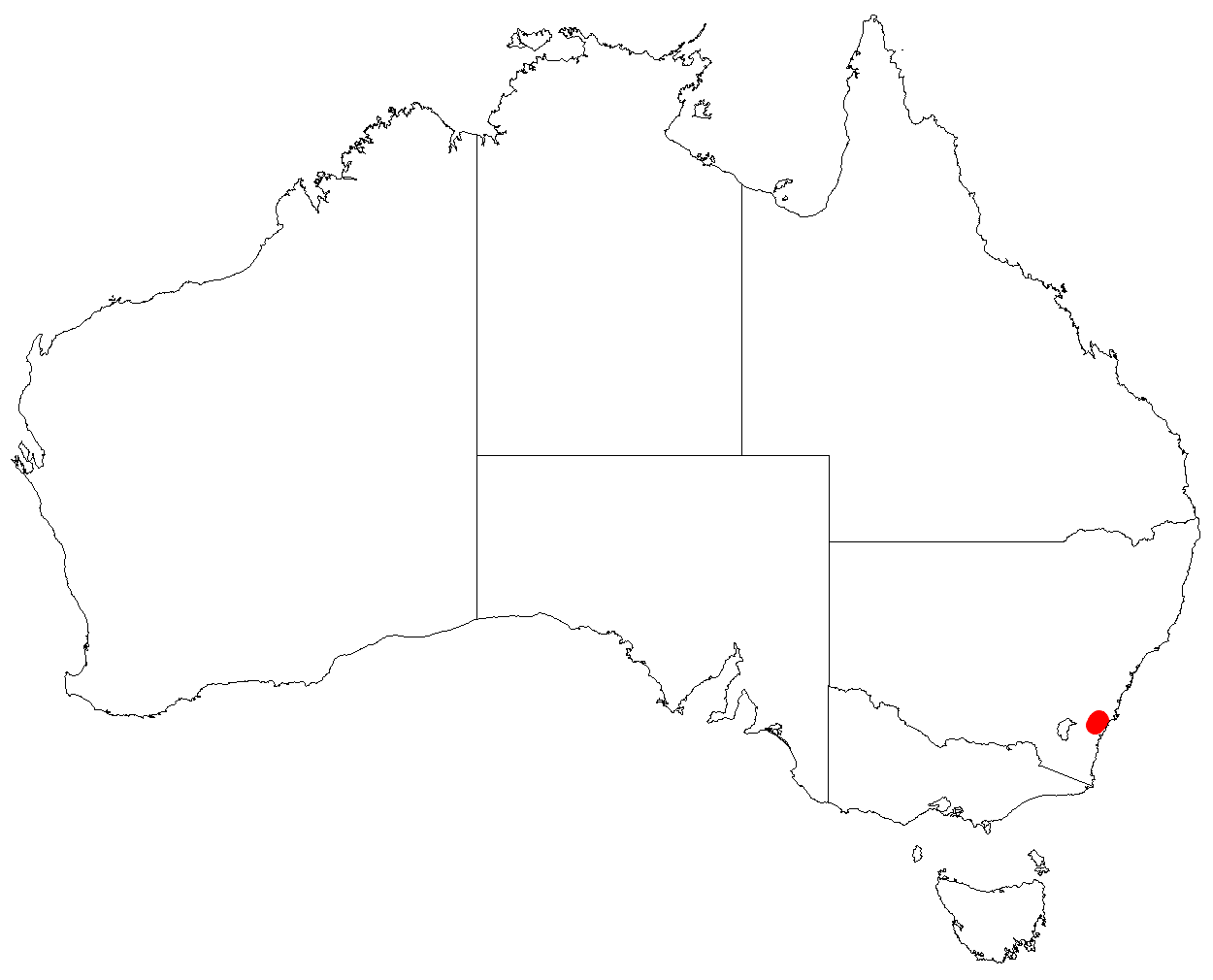
- Occurrence data from AVH

Australian species of plant

Leptospermum crassifolium is a species of shrub that is endemic to the Budawang Range in New South Wales. It has thin, rough bark that is shed annually, broadly elliptic leaves, white flowers borne singly on short side branches, and woody fruit.

== Description ==
Leptospermum crassifolium is a shrub that typically grows to a height of 1–2 m (3 ft 3 in – 6 ft 7 in) and has thin, rough bark that is shed annually. The leaves are thick, broadly elliptical, about 7 mm (0.28 in) long and 3–4 mm (0.12–0.16 in) wide with a short, blunt point on the tip and a short petiole at the base. The flowers are about 18 mm (0.71 in) in diameter and are borne singly on short side shoots. The floral cup is mostly glabrous, about 5 mm (0.20 in) long on a fluted pedicel. The sepals are triangular, about 5 mm (0.20 in) long, the petals white, about 7 mm (0.28 in) long and the stamens arranged in groups of between five and seven, about 4 mm (0.16 in) long. Flowering occurs in February and the fruit is a woody capsule 8–10 mm (0.31–0.39 in) in diameter that remains on the plant with the sepals attached.

== Taxonomy and naming ==
Leptospermum crassifolium was first formally described in 1989 by Joy Thompson in the journal Telopea. The specific epithet (crassifolium) is derived from Latin words meaning "thick" and "-leaved" referring to the texture of the leaves.

== Distribution and habitat ==
Leptospermum crassifolium grows in sand and sandstone rock crevices on peaks in the Budawang Range.
