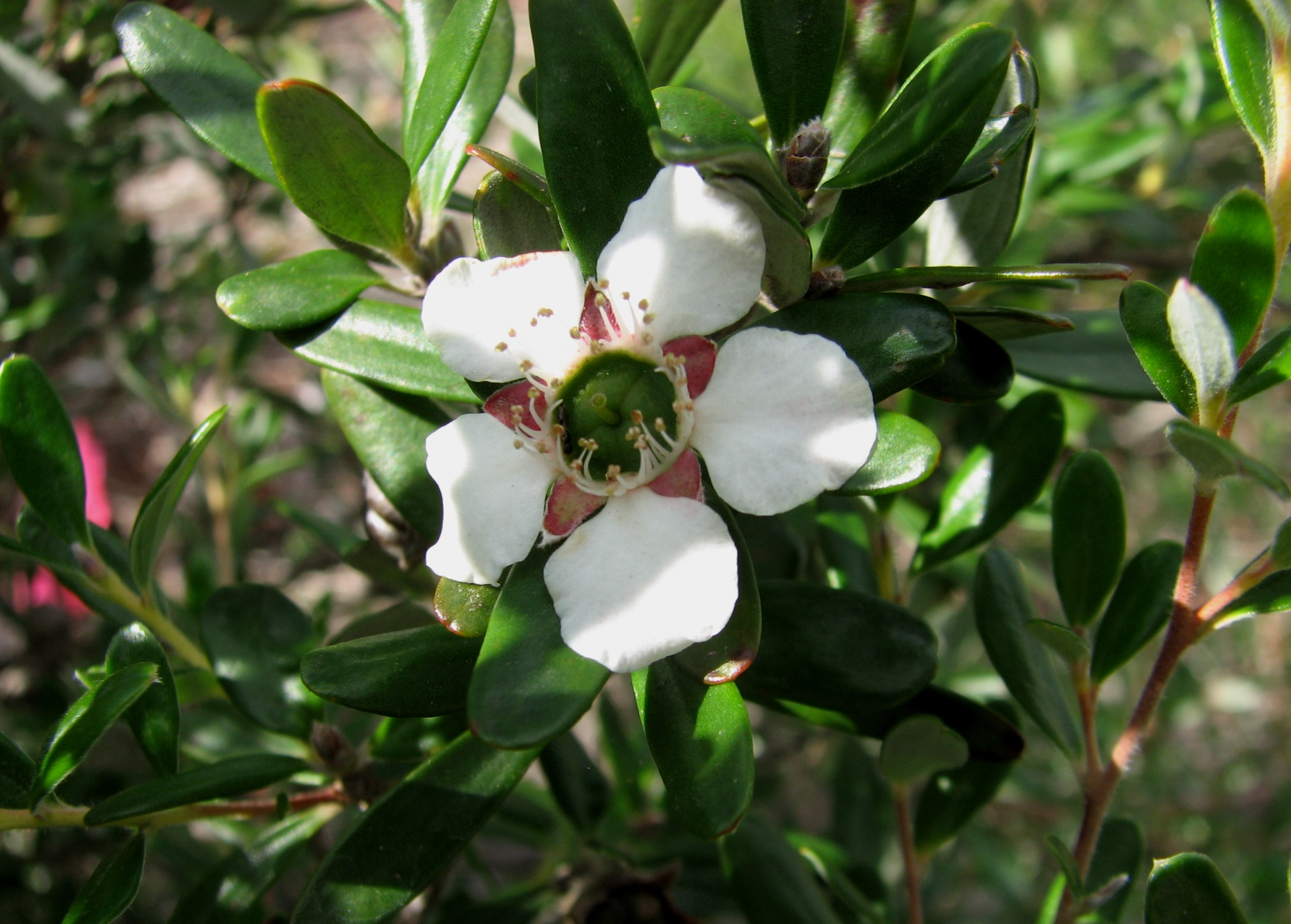
- In Royal Botanic Gardens, Cranbourne

Scientific classification
- Kingdom: Plantae
- Clade: Tracheophytes
- Clade: Angiosperms
- Clade: Eudicots
- Clade: Rosids
- Order: Myrtales
- Family: Myrtaceae
- Genus: Leptospermum
- Species: L. deuense

Binomial name
- Leptospermum deuense Joy Thomps.
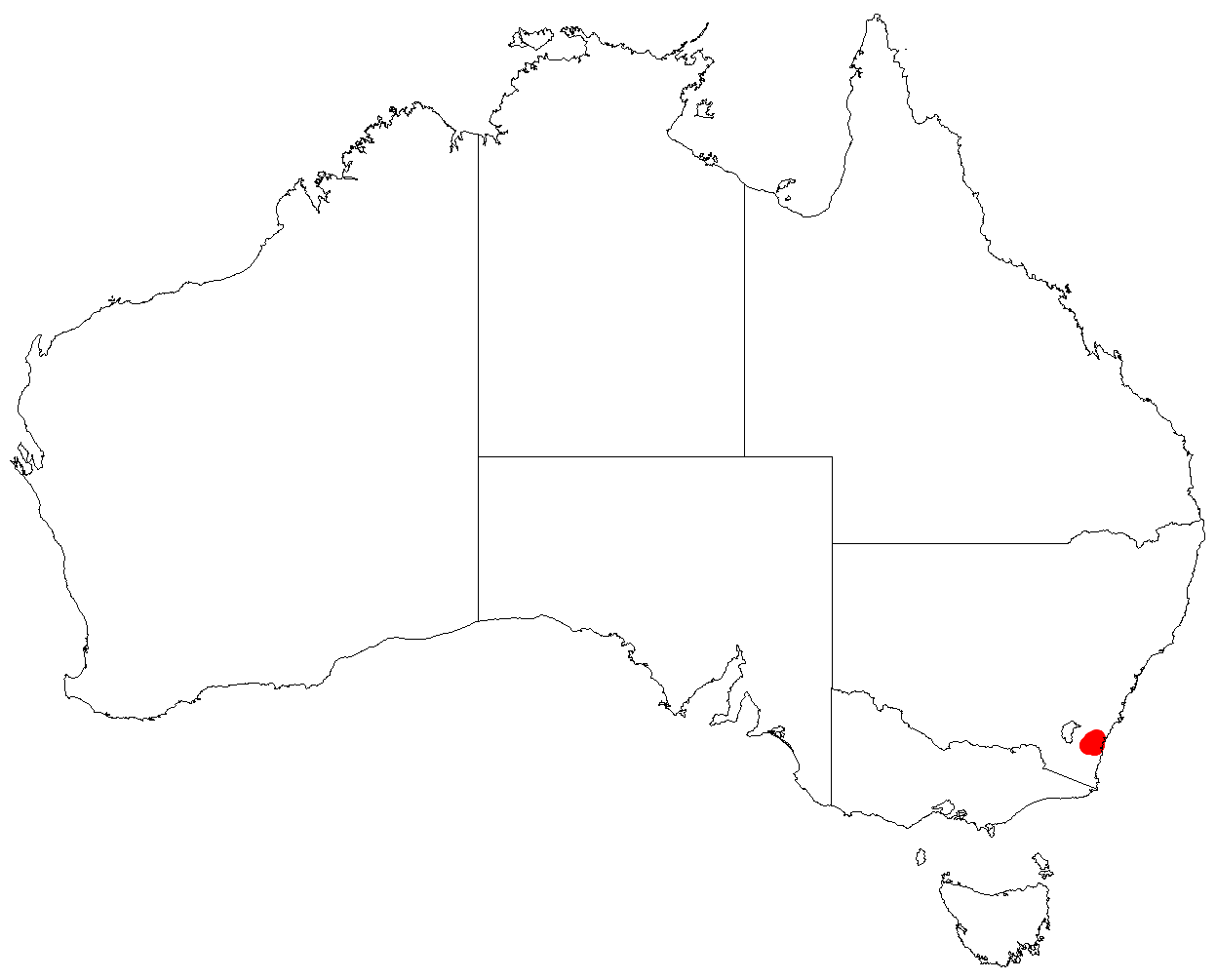
- Occurrence data from AVH

= Leptospermum deuense =

Species of shrub

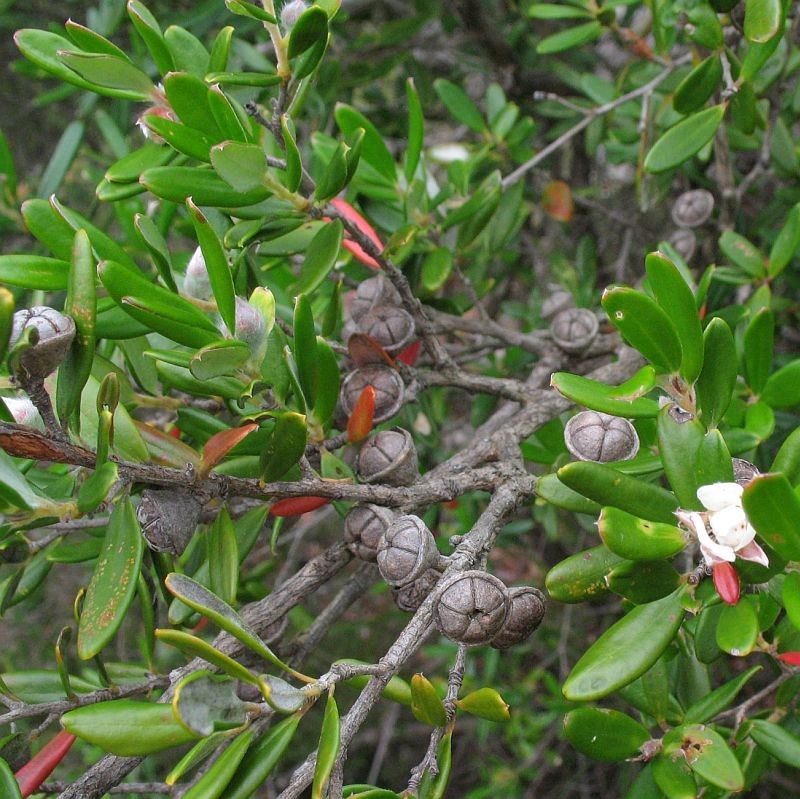
Fruit

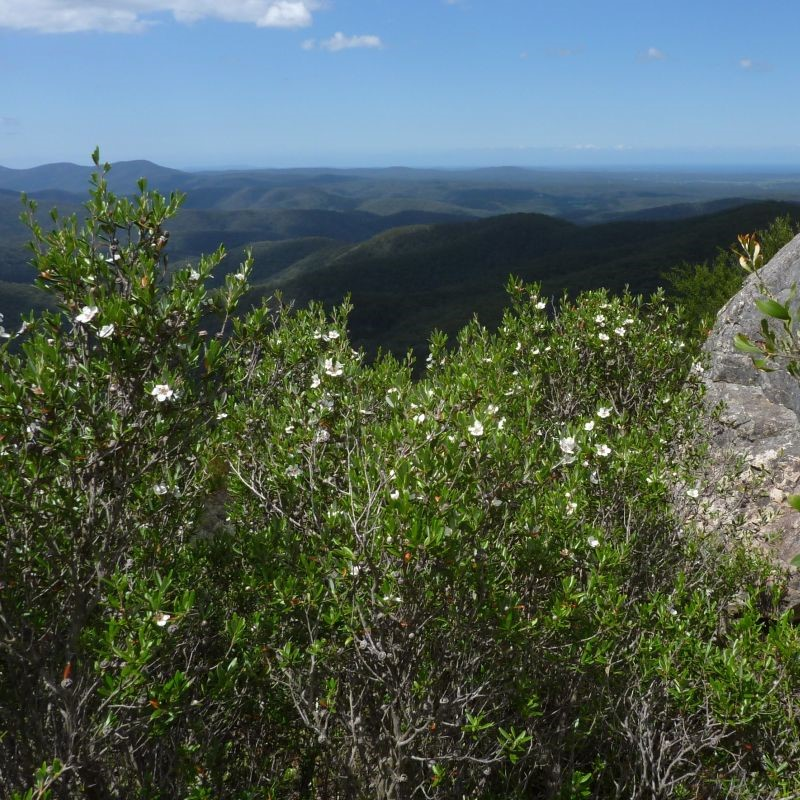
Habit in Deua National Park

Leptospermum deuense is a species of shrub that is endemic to New South Wales. It is a leafy, densely branched shrub with rough bark on the older stems, elliptical leaves with a glossy upper surface, white flowers arranged singly or in pairs and woody fruit.

== Description ==
Leptospermum deuense is a leafy, densely branched shrub that typically grows to about 1.5 m (4 ft 11 in) high. It has rough bark on the older stems, smooth bark with soft hairs on the younger stems. The leaves are glossy green on the upper surface, densely hairy on the lower side, elliptical to lance-shaped, 10–30 mm (0.39–1.18 in) long and 6–8 mm (0.24–0.31 in) wide. The flowers are white and are borne singly or in pairs on short side branches, and are about 15 mm (0.59 in) in diameter. The floral cup is hairy, about 4 mm (0.16 in) long on a pedicel 1 mm (0.039 in) or more long. The sepals are triangular, 3–4 mm (0.12–0.16 in) long and densely hairy. The petals are about 7–8 mm (0.28–0.31 in) long and the stamens are about 4 mm (0.16 in) long. Flowering mainly occurs in February and the fruit is a woody capsule 8–10 mm (0.31–0.39 in) in diameter.

== Taxonomy ==
This species was formally described in 1989 by botanist Joy Thompson in the botanical journal Telopea, based on plant material collected from Deua National Park in 1984. The specific epithet (deuense) refers to the collection of the type specimens near the Deua River.

== Distribution and habitat ==
Leptospermum deuense is only known from a small area on mountains in the Deua National Park near Moruya where it grows in scrub or exposed woodland on a rhyolite ridge.

== Use in horticulture ==
The species has only been recently introduced to cultivation, but has proved itself readily adaptable to a range of soil conditions and able to withstand frosts to −7 °C (19 °F). It can be propagated by seed or cuttings.
