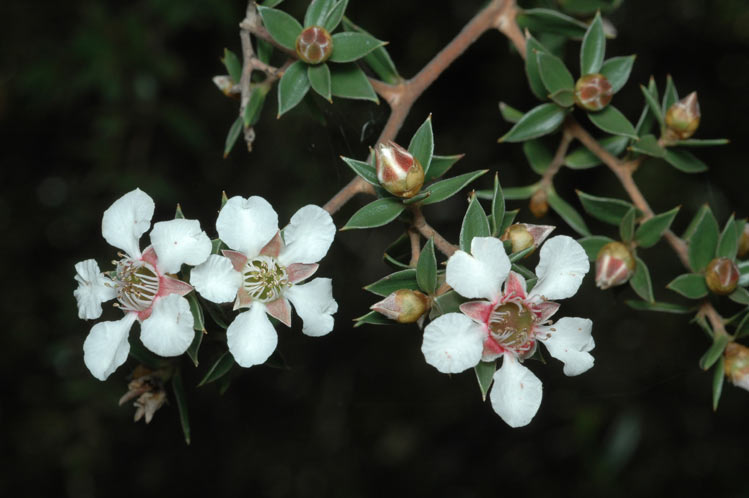
- In the Australian National Botanic Gardens

Scientific classification
- Kingdom: Plantae
- Clade: Tracheophytes
- Clade: Angiosperms
- Clade: Eudicots
- Clade: Rosids
- Order: Myrtales
- Family: Myrtaceae
- Genus: Leptospermum
- Species: L. petraeum

Binomial name
- Leptospermum petraeum Joy Thomps.

= Leptospermum petraeum =

Species of flowering plant

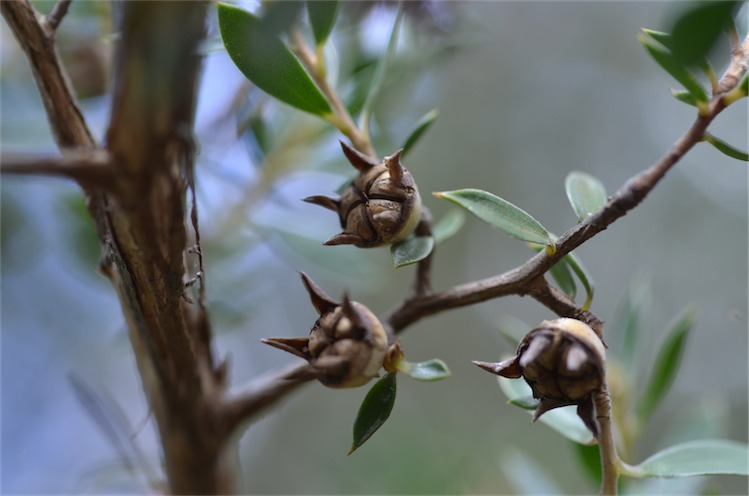
Habit

Leptospermum petraeum is a rigid, spreading plant that is endemic to a restricted area of New South Wales. It has thin, flaky bark, young stems that are hairy at first, aromatic, elliptical leaves, relatively large white flowers and fruit that remain on the plant until it dies.

== Description ==
Leptospermum petraeum is a spreading, rigid shrub that typically grows to a height of about 3 m (9.8 ft). The bark on older stems is thin and flaky, the younger stems hairy with an indistinct flange. The leaves are aromatic, broadly elliptical with a sharp point on the tip, about 15 mm (0.59 in) long and 5–6 mm (0.20–0.24 in) wide with a distinct petiole. The flowers are borne singly on short side shoots and are white, about 22 mm (0.87 in) wide. There are broad, yellowish-brown bracts and bracteoles at the base of the flower bud. The floral cup is mostly glabrous, about 4 mm (0.16 in) long and the sepals are hairy, 4–6 mm (0.16–0.24 in) long. The petals are about 7 mm (0.28 in) long and the stamens 2.5–3 mm (0.098–0.118 in) long. The flowering period is uncertain but the fruit is a capsule about 7–8 mm (0.28–0.31 in) in diameter, and that remains on the plant until it is burnt.

== Taxonomy and naming ==
Leptospermum petraeum was first formally described in 1989 by Joy Thompson in the journal Telopea, based on plant material she collected in Kanangra. The specific epithet (petraeum) is from a Latin word meaning "growing among rocks", referring to the habitat of this species.

== Distribution and habitat ==
This tea-tree grows is only known from the type population where it grows on an exposed rocky outcrop.
