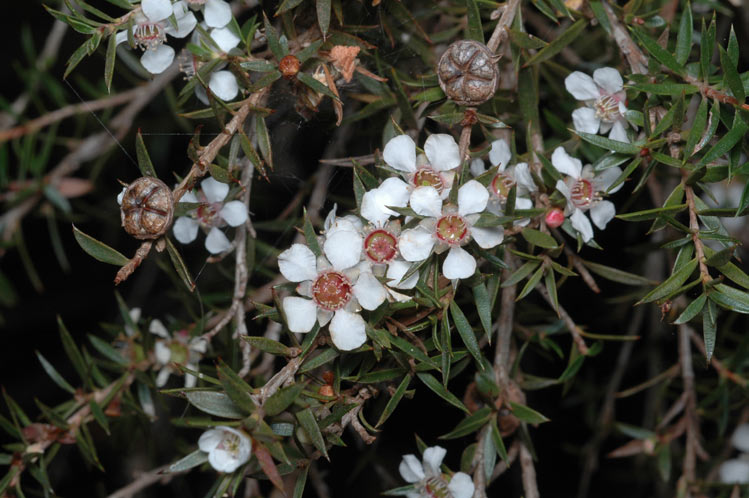
- In the Australian National Botanic Gardens

Scientific classification
- Kingdom: Plantae
- Clade: Tracheophytes
- Clade: Angiosperms
- Clade: Eudicots
- Clade: Rosids
- Order: Myrtales
- Family: Myrtaceae
- Genus: Leptospermum
- Species: L. rupicola

Binomial name
- Leptospermum rupicola Joy Thomps.

= Leptospermum rupicola =

Species of shrub

Leptospermum rupicola is a low-growing shrub that is endemic to New South Wales where it grows near cliffs. It has thin, rough bark, narrow lance-shaped leaves, white flowers and relatively large fruit that remain on the plant at maturity.

== Description ==
Leptospermum rupicola is a low-growing shrub that typically grows to a height 1 m (3 ft 3 in) or less. It has thin, firm bark, the younger stems with flattened hairs at first and a conspicuous flange. The leaves are narrow lance-shaped, about 10–20 mm (0.39–0.79 in) long and 2–4 mm (0.079–0.157 in) wide with a sharp point on the tip and tapering at the base but without a petiole. The flowers are white, 10–20 mm (0.39–0.79 in) wide and are borne singly on short side shoots from adjacent leaf axils. There are a few reddish-brown bracts at the base of the young flower buds but they are soon shed. The floral cup is glabrous, about 3 mm (0.12 in) long and the sepals about 2 mm (0.079 in) long. The petals are about 5 mm (0.20 in) long and the stamens 1.5–3 mm (0.059–0.118 in) long. Flowering mainly occurs from March to May and from September to October. The fruit is a capsule 6–10 mm (0.24–0.39 in) in diameter, the sepals having fallen off, and that remains on the plant when mature.

== Taxonomy and naming ==
Leptospermum rupicola was first formally described in 1989 by Joy Thompson in the journal Telopea, based on plant material collected by Ernest Constable at Nellie's Glen near Blackheath in 1957. The species is named for its habitat.

== Distribution and habitat ==
This tea-tree grows in shrubby communities near high sandstone cliffs in central-eastern New South Wales. A group of about a dozen plants survive in an abandoned railway cutting at Lawson in the Blue Mountains of New South Wales. This being the most eastern end of its distribution in the Blue Mountains.
