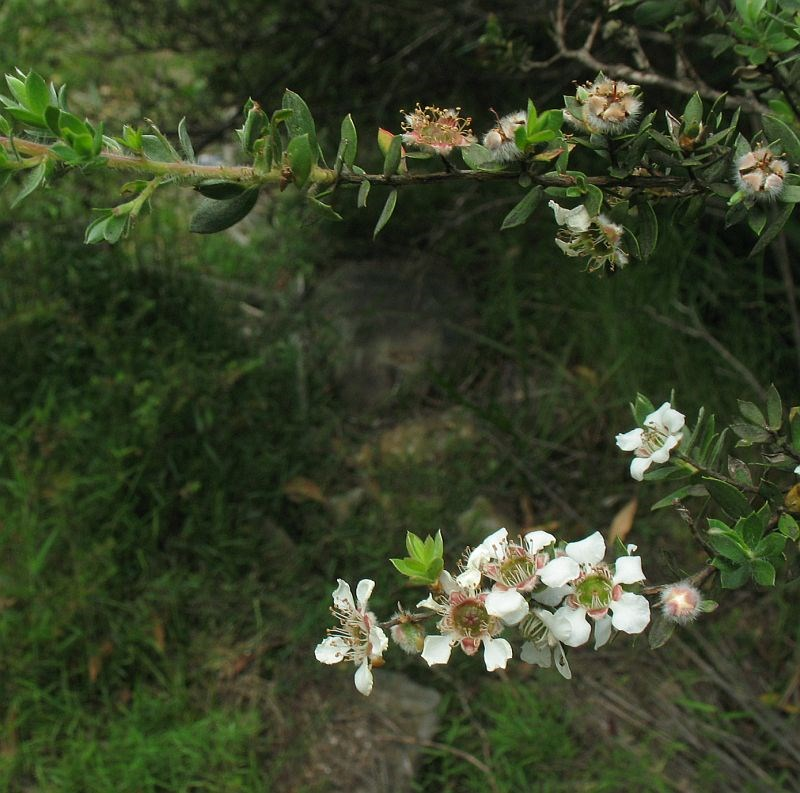
- Near Clyde Mountain

Conservation status
- Vulnerable (EPBC Act)

Scientific classification
- Kingdom: Plantae
- Clade: Tracheophytes
- Clade: Angiosperms
- Clade: Eudicots
- Clade: Rosids
- Order: Myrtales
- Family: Myrtaceae
- Genus: Leptospermum
- Species: L. thompsonii

Binomial name
- Leptospermum thompsonii Joy Thomps.

= Leptospermum thompsonii =

Monga tea-tree

Species of shrub

Leptospermum thompsonii, commonly known as the monga tea-tree, is a species of tall shrub that is endemic to south eastern New South Wales. It has rough, flaky bark, broadly elliptical to egg-shaped leaves with the narrower end towards the base, and a sharply-pointed tip, white flowers and fruit that remains on the plant at maturity.

== Description ==
Leptospermum thompsonii is an erect shrub of that grows to a height of 1–6 m (3 ft 3 in – 19 ft 8 in) and rough, fibrous or flaky bark and young stems that are covered with soft hairs. The leaves are elliptical to egg-shaped with the narrower end towards the base, mostly 10–15 mm (0.39–0.59 in) long and 4–6 mm (0.16–0.24 in) wide with a sharply-pointed tip and tapering to a short petiole. The flowers are white, about 15 mm (0.59 in) wide and arranged singly on short side shoots. The floral cup is covered with soft hairs, about 4 mm (0.16 in) long tapering to a very short pedicel. The sepals are also hairy, broadly egg-shaped, about 3 mm (0.12 in) long, the five petals 4–6 mm (0.16–0.24 in) long and the stamens 2–3 mm (0.079–0.118 in) long. Flowering mostly occurs from December to March and the fruit is a capsule about 10 mm (0.39 in) wide that remains on the plant at maturity.

== Taxonomy and naming ==
Leptospermum thompsonii was first formally described in 1989 by Joy Thompson in the journal Telopea from specimens collected by John Boorman in 1915. The specific epithet (thompsonii) honours M.M.H. Thompson, the husband of the describing botanist, for his "assistance in the collection and field study of this and many other species".

== Distribution and habitat ==
Monga tea-tree grows in permanently moist or wet habitats in forest and is known from populations in Monga National Park, Budawang National Park and Morton National Park.

== Conservation status ==
This tea-tree is listed as "vulnerable" under the Australian Government Environment Protection and Biodiversity Conservation Act 1999 and the New South Wales Government Biodiversity Conservation Act 2016. The main threats to the species are altered fire regimes, forestry activities, rubbish dumping and oil spills.
