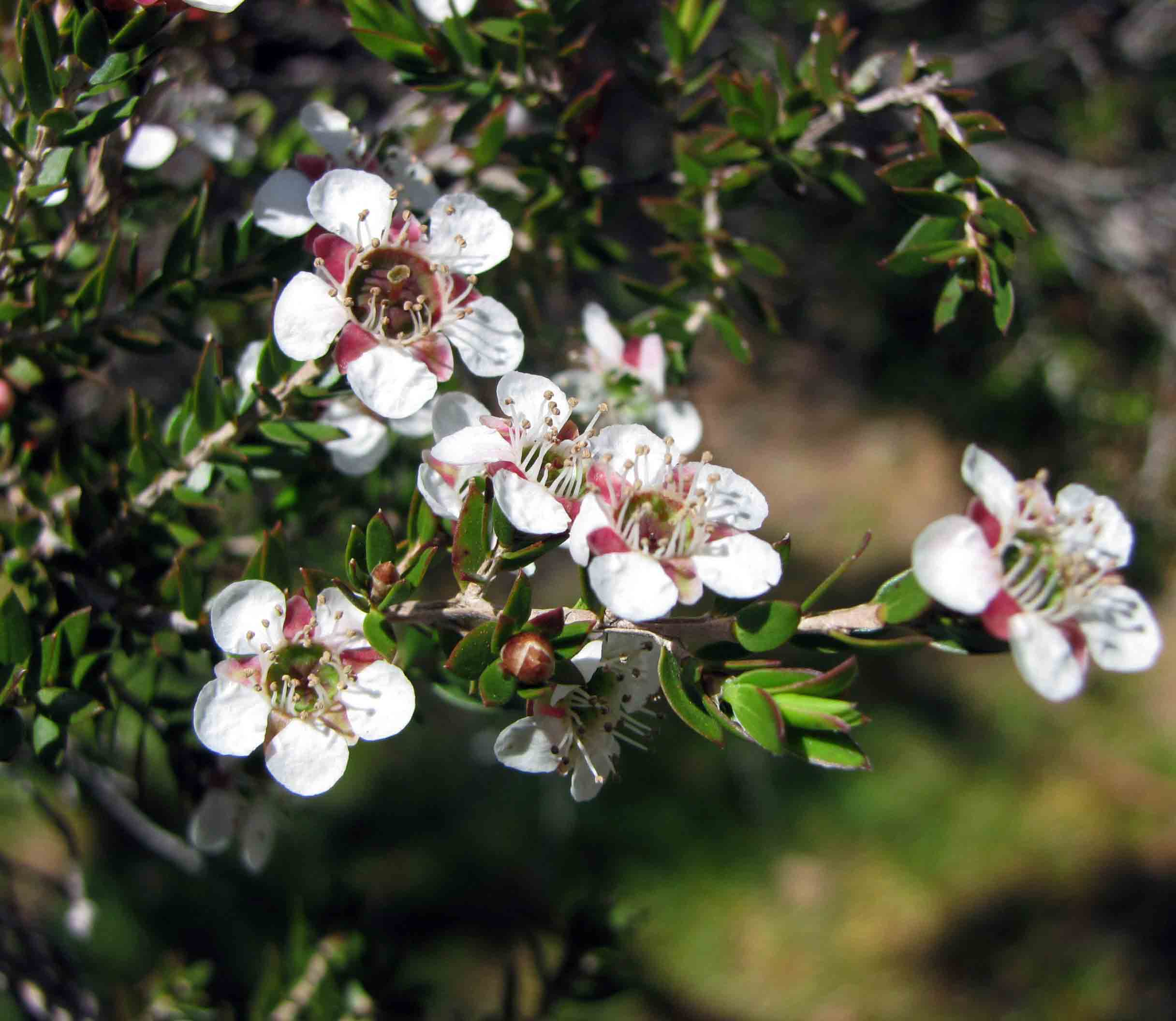
- Leptospermum novae-angliae in the ANBG

Scientific classification
- Kingdom: Plantae
- Clade: Tracheophytes
- Clade: Angiosperms
- Clade: Eudicots
- Clade: Rosids
- Order: Myrtales
- Family: Myrtaceae
- Genus: Leptospermum
- Species: L. novae-angliae

Binomial name
- Leptospermum novae-angliae Joy Thomps.

= Leptospermum novae-angliae =

Species of shrub

Leptospermum novae-angliae is a species of shrub that is endemic to eastern Australia. It has elliptical leaves that are usually crowded, single white flowers on short shoots and fruit that remain on the plant until it dies. It usually grows in rocky places.

== Description ==
Leptospermum novae-angliae is a shrub that typically grows to a height of up to 2 m (6 ft 7 in) with flaking bark on the older stems. Younger stems are silky-hairy at first, becoming glabrous later. The leaves are crowded, broadly to very narrow elliptical, 5–15 mm (0.20–0.59 in) long and 1–4 mm (0.039–0.157 in) wide tapering to a short, broad petiole. The flowers are borne singly on the ends of side shoots that continue to grow after flowering. The flowers are white, 10–12 mm (0.39–0.47 in) wide with reddish brown bracts at the base of the flower bud and sometimes the open flower. The floral cup is glabrous, about 4 mm (0.16 in) long and covered with conspicuous glands. The sepals are broadly egg-shaped, about 2.5 mm (0.098 in) long, the petals about 5 mm (0.20 in) long and the stamens 2.5–4 mm (0.098–0.157 in) long. Flowering mainly occurs from October to November and the fruit is a variably-sized capsule 5–12 mm (0.20–0.47 in) in diameter but often wider or narrower. The fruit remains on the plant until it dies, the sepal remnants having fallen.

== Taxonomy and naming ==
Leptospermum novae-angliae was first formally described in 1989 by Joy Thompson in the journal Telopea, based on plant material collected in 1962 by Ernest Francis Constable on Bald Rock near Tenterfield. The specific epithet (novae-angliae) refers to the New England Tableland where the species occurs.

== Distribution and habitat ==
This tea-tree grows in heath and forest in rocky places, especially on granite outcrops on the New England Tableland and nearby areas of the Western Slopes of New South Wales and south-eastern Queensland, north from Point Lookout.

== Conservation status ==
This species is classified as of "least concern" under the Queensland Government Nature Conservation Act 1992.
