= Leptospermum barneyense =

Scientific classification
- Kingdom: Plantae
- Clade: Tracheophytes
- Clade: Angiosperms
- Clade: Eudicots
- Clade: Rosids
- Order: Myrtales
- Family: Myrtaceae
- Genus: Leptospermum
- Species: L. barneyense

Binomial name
- Leptospermum barneyense A.R.Bean
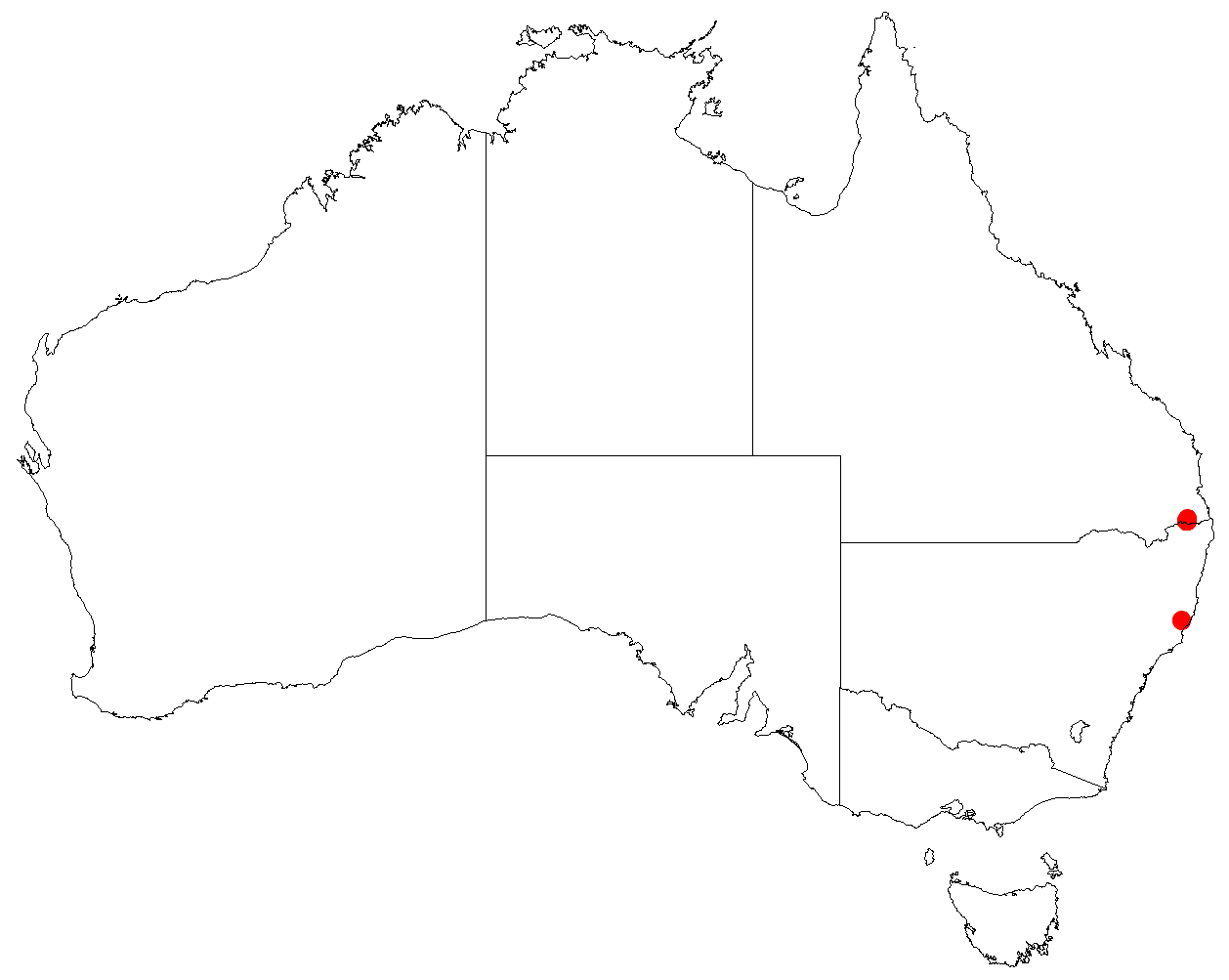
- Occurrence data from AVH

Australian species of plant

Leptospermum barneyense is a species of shrub that is endemic to the Mount Barney National Park in Queensland. It has rough, fibrous bark, young branches with conspicuous flanges, lance-shaped leaves, white or pink flowers and hemispherical fruit.

== Description ==
Leptospermum barneyense is a shrub that typically grows to a height of 2.5 m (8 ft 2 in) and has rough, fibrous, grey bark on the stem and branches. Young branchlets are glabrous with conspicuous flanges. The leaves are arranged alternately, more or less sessile, the same colour on both surfaces, lance-shaped, 17–23 mm (0.67–0.91 in) long and 2.5–5 mm (0.098–0.197 in) wide. The lower side of the young leaves are hairy near their base. The flowers are borne singly in leaf axils and are 17–25 mm (0.67–0.98 in) and sessile. The sepals are usually pink, glabrous and 3–4 mm (0.12–0.16 in) long. The petals are white, sometimes pink, egg-shaped to round, 5.5–8 mm (0.22–0.31 in) long and the stamens are 2.5–3 mm (0.098–0.118 in) long. Flowering occurs from June to October and the fruit is a sessile, thick-walled, glabrous capsule about 5.5–8 mm (0.22–0.31 in) long and 8–11.5 mm (0.31–0.45 in) wide with a hemispherical hypanthium.

== Taxonomy and naming ==
Leptospermum barneyense was first formally described in 2004 by Anthony Bean who published the description in the journal Telopea from specimens collected in the Mount Barney National Park. The specific epithet (barneyense) is a reference to the type location.

== Distribution and habitat ==
This leptospermum grows in heath and low woodland at altitudes between 600–1,350 m (1,970–4,430 ft).

== Conservation status ==
This species is classified as of "vulnerable" under the Queensland Government Nature Conservation Act 1992.
