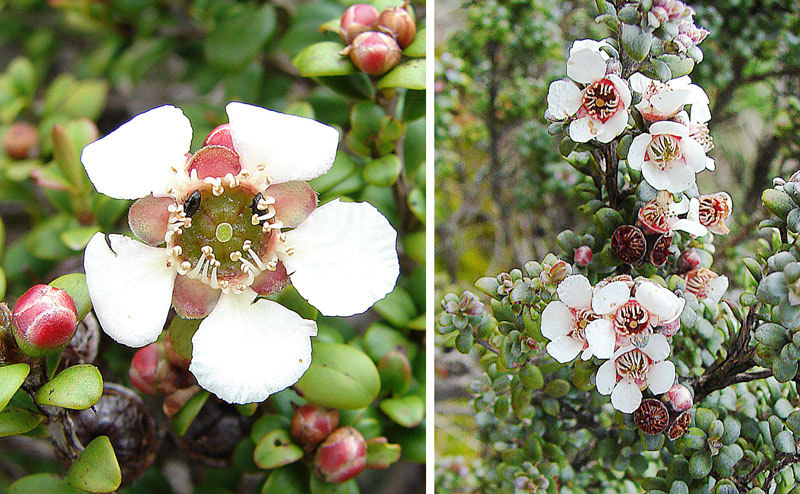

Scientific classification
- Kingdom: Plantae
- Clade: Tracheophytes
- Clade: Angiosperms
- Clade: Eudicots
- Clade: Rosids
- Order: Myrtales
- Family: Myrtaceae
- Genus: Leptospermum
- Species: L. recurvum

Binomial name
- Leptospermum recurvum Hook.f.

= Leptospermum recurvum =

Species of shrub

Leptospermum recurvum (locally known as sayat-sayat) is a species of shrub or tree that is native to Mount Kinabalu in Malaysian Borneo and to Sulawesi. It has pale, flaky bark, broadly elliptical to almost round leaves, white flowers about 12 mm (0.47 in) wide and fruit that tend to remain on the plant for a year or two.

== Description ==
Leptospermum recurvum is sometimes a prostrate shrub, sometimes a tree to 20 m (66 ft) or more in height. It has thin, pale, flaky bark and young stems that have a broad flange near the leaf bases. The leaves are broadly elliptical to egg-shaped or almost round with their edges strongly curved downwards, mostly 3–5 mm (0.12–0.20 in) long and 2–3 mm (0.079–0.118 in) wide, and lack a petiole. The upper surface of the leaves is mostly glossy and the lower surface usually silky-hairy at first. The flowers are white, about 12 mm (0.47 in) wide and arranged singly on short side shoots. There are broad reddish brown bracts at the base of the flower buds that mostly remain at the base of the open flowers. The floral cup is 2–3 mm (0.079–0.118 in) long, tapering to a short pedicel. The sepals are 1.5–2 mm (0.059–0.079 in) long and almost hemispherical, the petals are about 5 mm (0.20 in) long and the stamens about 2.5 mm (0.098 in) long. Flowering probably occurs in most months. The fruit is a capsule 6–7 mm (0.24–0.28 in) wide and that tends to remain on the plant for a few years.

== Taxonomy and naming ==
Leptospermum recurvum was first formally described in 1852 by Joseph Dalton Hooker in William Jackson Hooker's book, Icones Plantarum. The type specimens were collected from "Kina Balu" where the species was recorded as being "abundant, from 7,000–8,500 ft (2,100–2,600 m), whitening the top of the mountain".

== Distribution and habitat ==
Leptospermum recurvum grows in crevices between rocks at high elevations on Mount Kinabalu.
