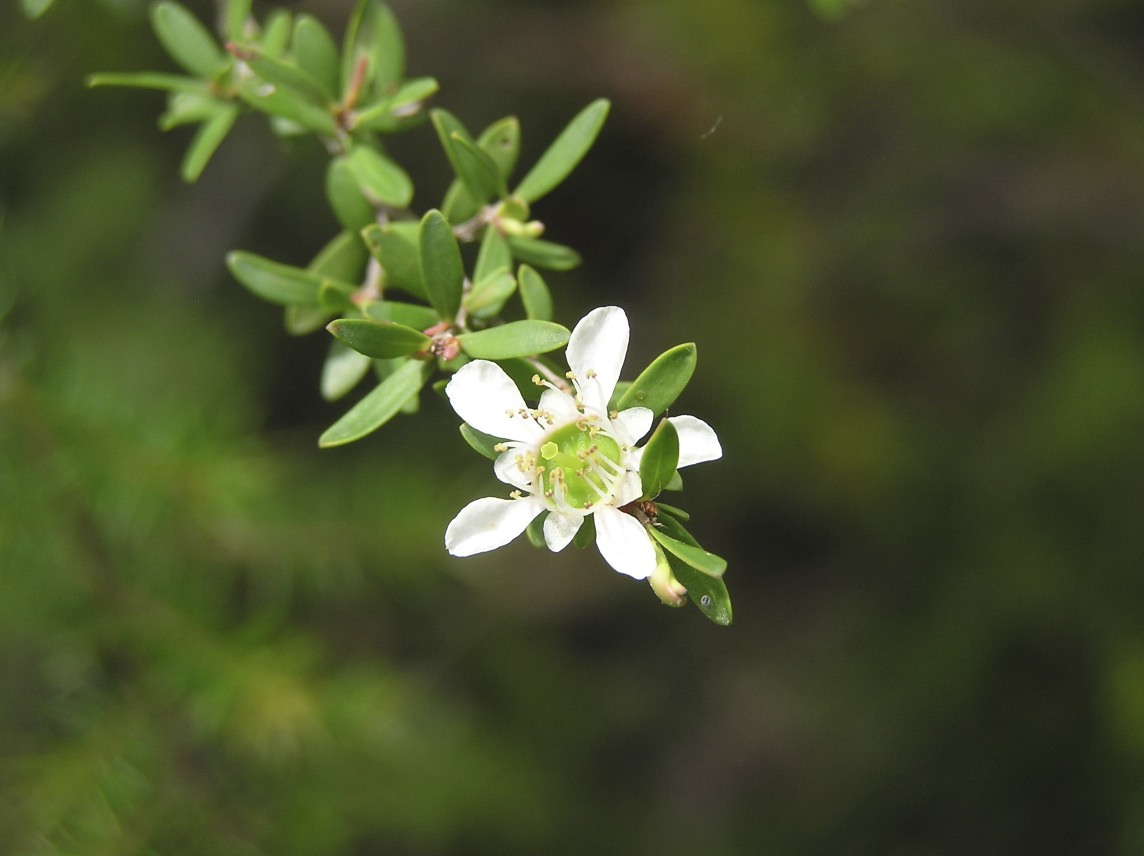
- Near Evans Head

Scientific classification
- Kingdom: Plantae
- Clade: Tracheophytes
- Clade: Angiosperms
- Clade: Eudicots
- Clade: Rosids
- Order: Myrtales
- Family: Myrtaceae
- Genus: Leptospermum
- Species: L. variabile

Binomial name
- Leptospermum variabile Joy Thomps.

= Leptospermum variabile =

Species of shrub

Leptospermum variabile is a species of shrub that is endemic to eastern Australia. It has thin, rough or scaly bark, broadly elliptical to lance-shaped leaves with the narrower end towards the base, white flowers arranged singly on the ends of short side branches, and woody fruit that remains on the plant when mature.

== Description ==
Leptospermum variabile is a shrub that typically grows to a height of 1–2 m (3 ft 3 in – 6 ft 7 in) but is sometimes a tree to more than 5 m (16 ft) and has reddish new growth. It has thin, rough or scaly bark and the younger stems are covered with soft hairs at first. The leaves are sessile, elliptical to lance-shaped with the narrower end towards the base, distinctly folded, 10–20 mm (0.39–0.79 in) long and 2–8 mm (0.079–0.315 in) wide with the base tapered. The flowers are white, borne singly on the ends of short side shoots and are about 15 mm (0.59 in) wide. The floral cup is glandular, about 4–6 mm (0.16–0.24 in) long, tapering to a short pedicel. The sepals are broadly egg-shaped, about 3 mm (0.12 in) long, the petals 6–8 mm (0.24–0.31 in) long and the stamens about 3–4 mm (0.12–0.16 in) long. Flowering mainly occurs from September to October and the fruit is a capsule, varying in size from about 5 mm (0.20 in) to 12 mm (0.47 in) in diameter, that remains on the plant when mature.

== Taxonomy and naming ==
Leptospermum variabile was formally described in 1989 by Joy Thompson in the journal Telopea from specimens collected by P.R. Sharp near Rathdowney in 1978. The specific epithet (variabile) refers to the variability of this species, especially of the width of the leaves and the size of the fruit.

== Distribution and habitat ==
Leptospermum variabile grows in crevices between rocks on rocky summits or ridges on the tablelands and coastal ranges from south east Queensland to near Taree in New South Wales.
