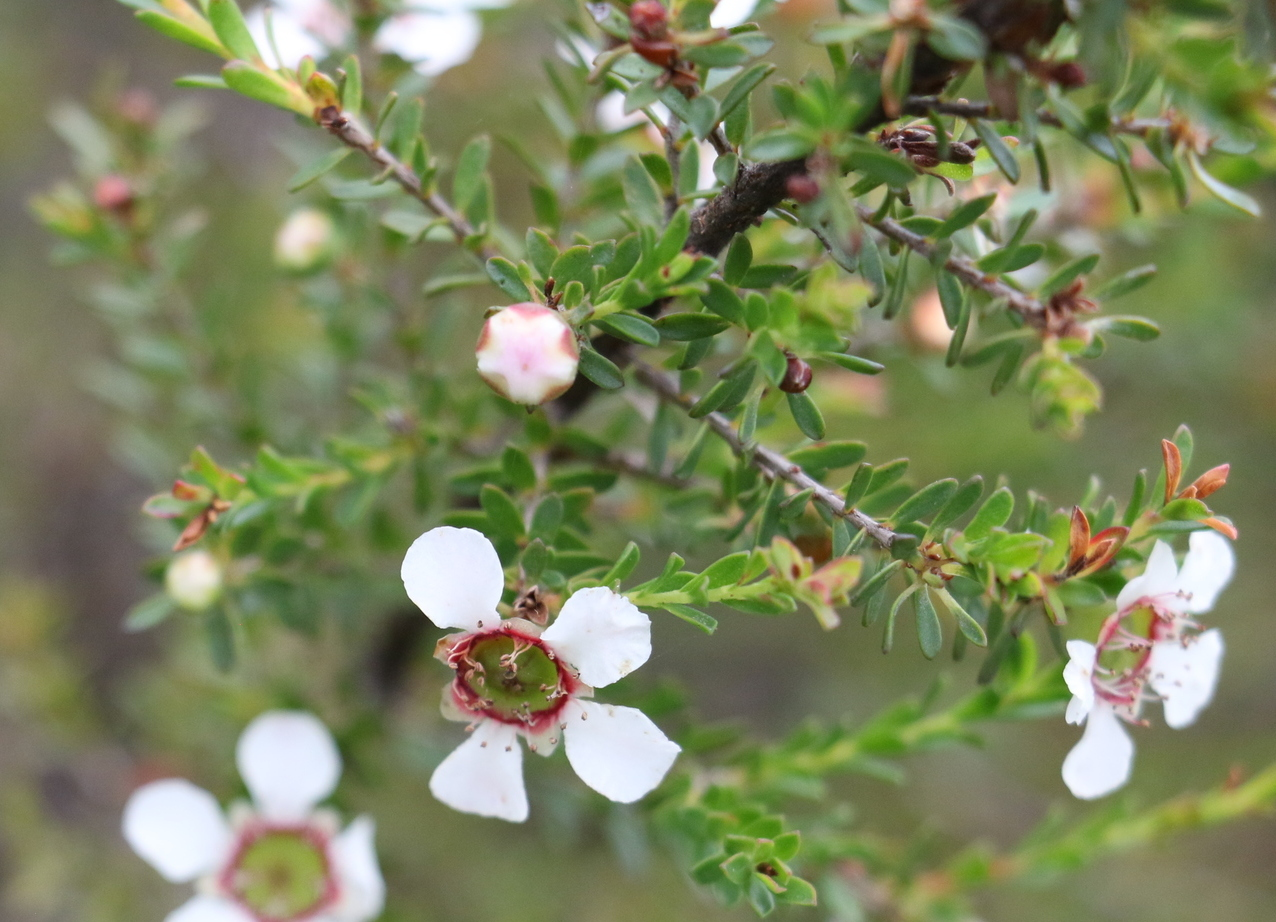
- Leptospermum oreophilum near Beerwah

Conservation status
- Vulnerable (NCA)

Scientific classification
- Kingdom: Plantae
- Clade: Tracheophytes
- Clade: Angiosperms
- Clade: Eudicots
- Clade: Rosids
- Order: Myrtales
- Family: Myrtaceae
- Genus: Leptospermum
- Species: L. oreophilum

Binomial name
- Leptospermum oreophilum Joy Thomps.

= Leptospermum oreophilum =

Rock tea tree

Species of shrub

Leptospermum oreophilum, commonly known as the rock tea tree, is a shrub that is endemic to the Glass House Mountains in southern Queensland. It has firm, rough bark on the older stems, elliptical leaves with a short, blunt point on the tip, relatively large white flowers arranged singly on side shoots and fruit that remains on the plant until it dies.

== Description ==
Leptospermum oreophilum is a shrub that typically grows to a height of 1–2.5 m (3 ft 3 in – 8 ft 2 in) with firm, rough bark on the older stems. Younger stems have minute hairs and a flange near the leaf base. The leaves are elliptical, silky-hairy at first, 10–15 mm (0.39–0.59 in) long and 2–4 mm (0.079–0.157 in) wide with a short, blunt tip and tapering at the base but without a petiole. The flowers are borne singly on side shoots and are white and 12–20 mm (0.47–0.79 in) wide. The floral cup is 2.5–4 mm (0.098–0.157 in) long and the sepals are glabrous, almost round and about 3 mm (0.12 in) long. The petals are 4–8 mm (0.16–0.31 in) long and the stamens are about 5 mm (0.20 in) long. Flowering mainly occurs from September to December and the fruit is a capsule 7–10 mm (0.28–0.39 in) in diameter and that remains on the plant at maturity, the remains of the sepals having fallen off.

== Taxonomy and naming ==
Leptospermum oreophilum was first formally described in 1989 by Joy Thompson in the journal Telopea. The specific epithet (oreophilum) is derived from ancient Greek, meaning "mountain-loving", referring to the mountain-top habit of this species.

== Distribution and habitat ==
This tea-tree grows in shallow soil in rocky places on the Glass House Mountains.

== Conservation status ==
This species is classified as "vulnerable" under the Queensland Government Nature Conservation Act 1992.
