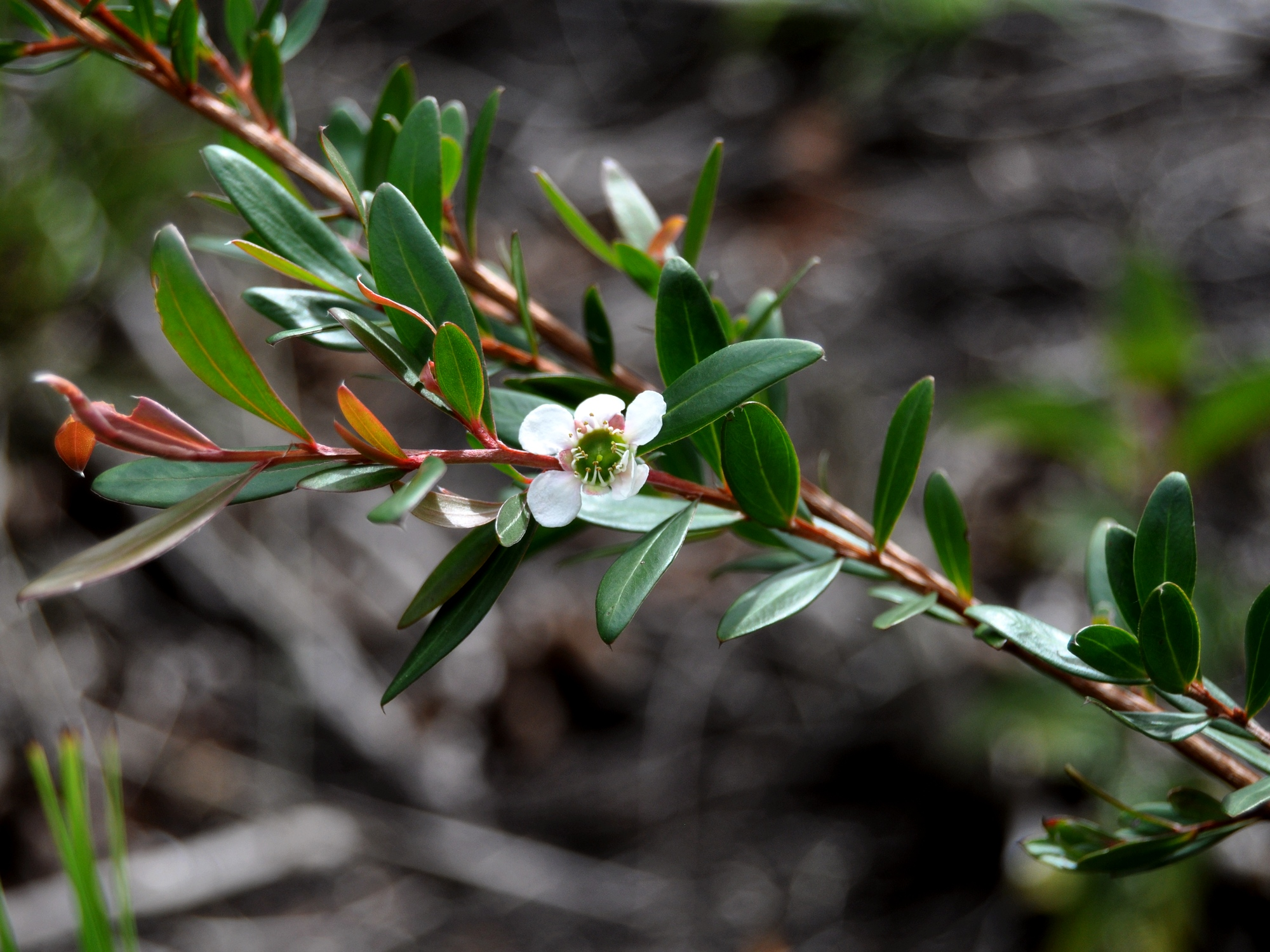

Scientific classification
- Kingdom: Plantae
- Clade: Tracheophytes
- Clade: Angiosperms
- Clade: Eudicots
- Clade: Rosids
- Order: Myrtales
- Family: Myrtaceae
- Genus: Leptospermum
- Species: L. javanicum

Binomial name
- Leptospermum javanicum Blume
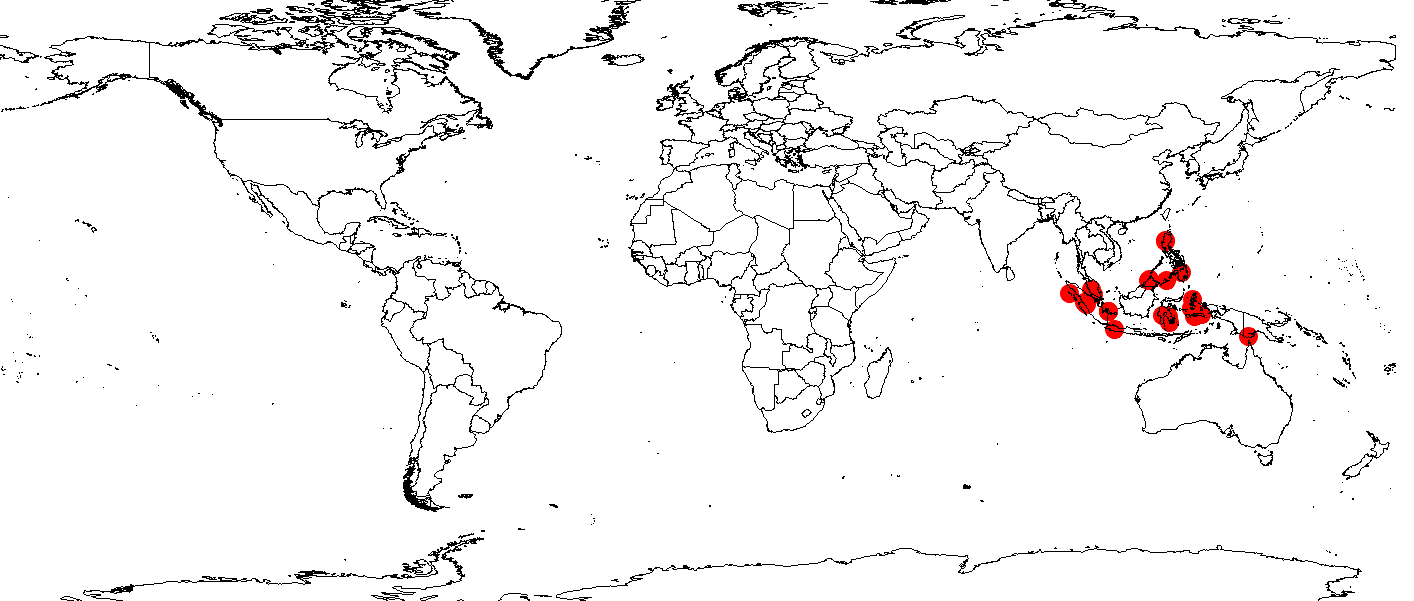
- Occurrence data from AVH

Synonyms
- Macklottia javanica (Blume) Korth.; Glaphyria annae Stein; Glaphyria nitida Jack; Leptospermum alpestre Blume; Leptospermum floribundum Jungh.; Leptospermum javanicum var. alpestre (Blume) Blume; Leptospermum javanicum var. congestum Blume

= Leptospermum javanicum =

Species of tree

Leptospermum javanicum is a species of tree that is native to Myanmar, western and central Malesia. It has fibrous bark on the trunk, leaves that are much paler on the lower surface, relatively large white flowers and woody fruit.

== Description ==
Leptospermum javanicum is a tree that typically grows to a height of about 6 m (20 ft) and has fibrous bark on the trunk and larger branches. The branchlets are covered with soft hairs when young and have prominent flanges extending from the base of the leaves. The leaves are elliptical to egg-shaped, dark green on the upper surface and much paler below, 10–30 mm (0.39–1.18 in) long, 4–9 mm (0.16–0.35 in) wide. The flowers are white, 15–20 mm (0.59–0.79 in) wide and are borne singly on short side branches on a pedicel up to 1 mm (0.039 in) long. The floral cup is covered with soft, silky hairs and the edges of the sepals are densely hairy. The petals are white and the fruit is a woody capsule that is domed above, 4–5 mm (0.16–0.20 in) long and 6–7 mm (0.24–0.28 in) wide.

== Taxonomy and naming ==
Leptospermum javanicum was first formally described in 1826 by Carl Ludwig Blume in his book Bijdragen tot de Flora van Nederlandsch Indie.

== Distribution and habitat ==
This tea-tree grows at altitudes of between 1,500 and 3,000 m (4,900 and 9,800 ft) from Myanmar to western Malesia.

== Uses ==
Isolates from L. javanicum have shown potential as anti-cancer treatments by inducing apoptosis in lung cancer cells and distorting their ability to undergo metastasis.
