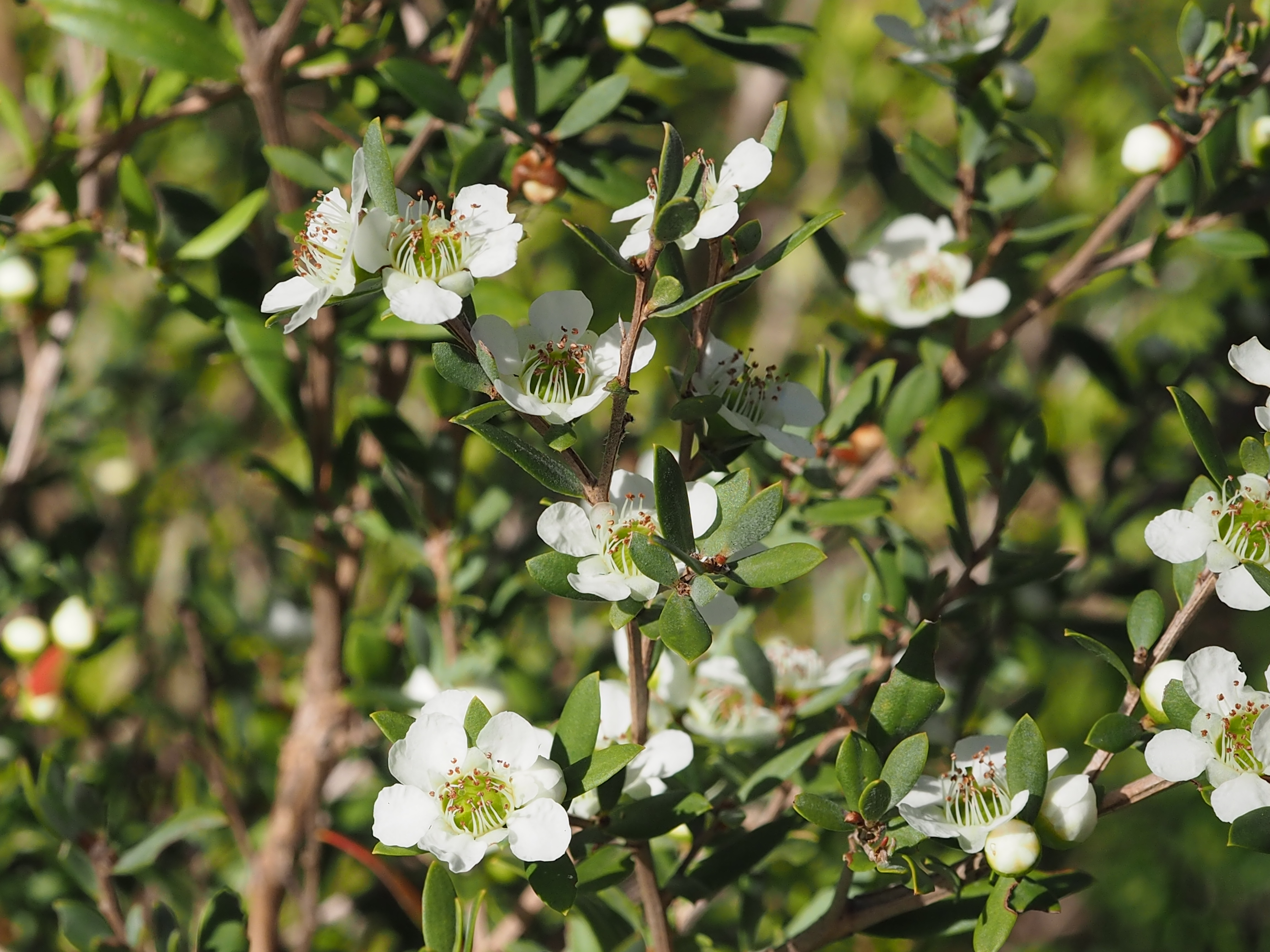
- In Cathedral Rock National Park

Scientific classification
- Kingdom: Plantae
- Clade: Tracheophytes
- Clade: Angiosperms
- Clade: Eudicots
- Clade: Rosids
- Order: Myrtales
- Family: Myrtaceae
- Genus: Leptospermum
- Species: L. gregarium

Binomial name
- Leptospermum gregarium Joy Thomps.
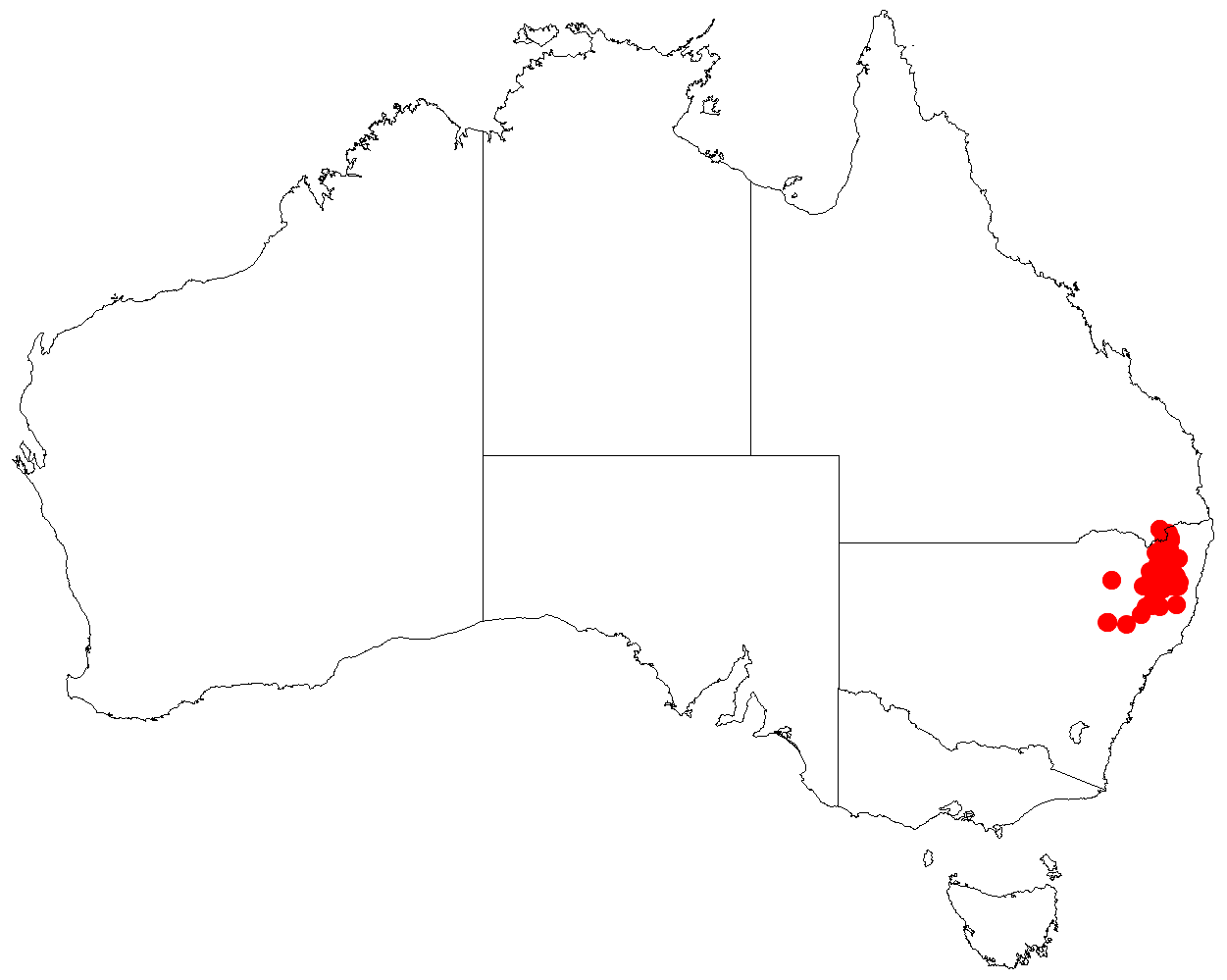
- Occurrence data from AVH

= Leptospermum gregarium =

Species of shrub

Leptospermum gregarium is a species of flowering plant that is endemic to eastern Australia. It is a shrub with hairy young stems, egg-shaped to lance-shaped leaves with the narrower end towards the base, white flowers arranged singly or in pairs. It usually grows in dense stands in swamps or along rocky creeks in high altitude place in northern New South Wales and south-eastern Queensland.

== Description ==
Leptospermum gregarium is a shrub that typically grows to a height of about 2 m (6 ft 7 in). Older stems have bark that is shed in strips or small flakes and younger stems are covered with fine hairs. The leaves are broadly egg-shaped to lance-shaped with the narrower end towards the base, mostly 5–10 mm (0.20–0.39 in) long and 2.5–4 mm (0.098–0.157 in) wide but sometimes longer. The flowers are white and are borne singly or in pairs on short side branches, and are less than 10 mm (0.39 in) in diameter. The floral cup is hairy, about 3 mm (0.12 in) long on very short pedicel. The sepals are triangular to more or less round, 1.5–2 mm (0.059–0.079 in) long, the petals about 3–4 mm (0.12–0.16 in) long and the stamens 1.5–2 mm (0.059–0.079 in) long. Flowering mainly occurs from November to December and the fruit is a capsule mostly 5–6 mm (0.20–0.24 in) in diameter and remain on the plant at maturity.

== Taxonomy ==
Leptospermum gregarium was first formally described in 1989 by Joy Thompson in the journal Telopea, based on plant material collected from 10 km (6.2 mi) from Ebor on the road to Guyra in 1981. The specific epithet (gregarium) refers to the tendency of this species to grow in dense stands.

== Distribution and habitat ==
Leptospermum gregarium grows in swamps and along rocky creeks in high altitude areas of New South Wales north from Nundle and of the Granite Belt in south-east Queensland.
