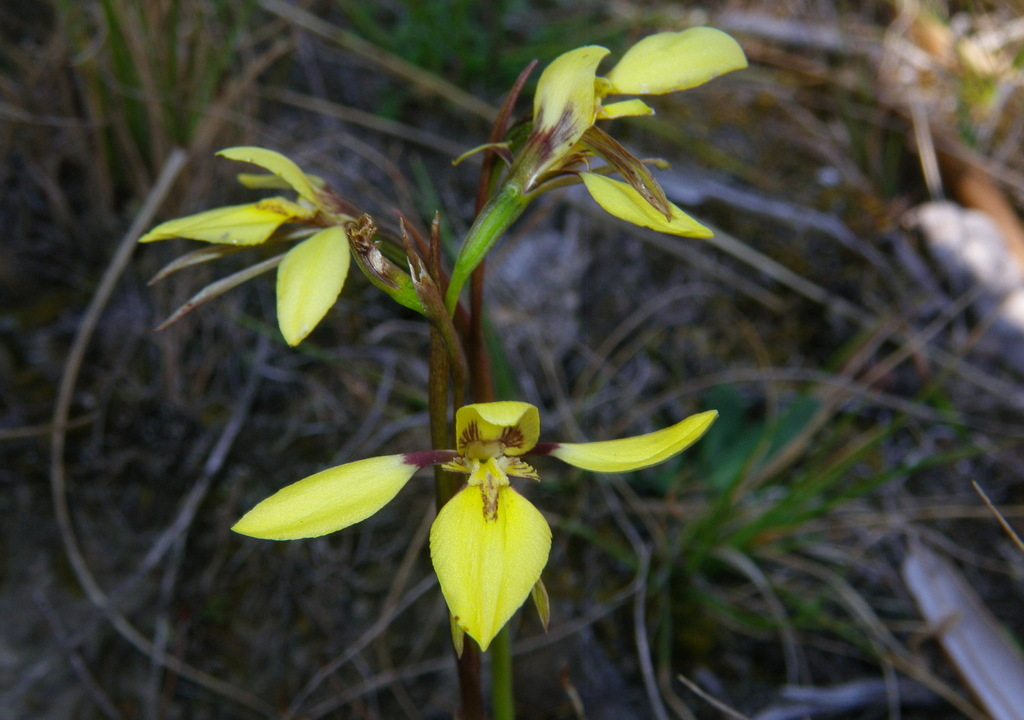
- East of Walcha

Scientific classification
- Kingdom: Plantae
- Clade: Tracheophytes
- Clade: Angiosperms
- Clade: Monocots
- Order: Asparagales
- Family: Orchidaceae
- Subfamily: Orchidoideae
- Tribe: Diurideae
- Genus: Diuris
- Species: D. systena

Binomial name
- Diuris systena D.L.Jones & L.M.Copel.

= Diuris systena =

Species of orchid

Diuris systena, commonly known as New England golden moths, is a species of orchid that is endemic to the Northern Tablelands of New South Wales. It has two or three grass-like, narrowly linear leaves and up to four lemon yellow and brownish-green flowers.

== Description ==
Diuris systena is a tuberous, perennial herb with two or three grass-like, linear leaves 150–350 mm (5.9–13.8 in) long and 3–5 mm (0.12–0.20 in) wide. Up to four lemon yellow flowers 30–35 mm (1.2–1.4 in) long are borne on a green flowering stem 150–350 mm (5.9–13.8 in) high. The dorsal sepal is egg-shaped, 9–15 mm (0.35–0.59 in) long, 4–6 mm (0.16–0.24 in) wide with a greenish-brown base and few faint stripes. The lateral sepals are brownish-green, sword-shaped and parallel to each other, 18–25 mm (0.71–0.98 in) long and 2.0–3.5 mm (0.079–0.138 in) wide. The petal blades are narrowly egg-shaped to narrowly elliptic, 8–18 mm (0.31–0.71 in) long and 4.0–6.5 mm (0.16–0.26 in) wide on a stalk 3–6 mm (0.12–0.24 in) long. The labellum is 12–17 mm (0.47–0.67 in) long with three lobes - the centre lobe egg-shaped, 8–15 mm (0.31–0.59 in) long and 7–12 mm (0.28–0.47 in) wide, the side lobes erect, linear to narrowly oblong, 2.0–4.5 mm (0.079–0.177 in) long and 0.8–2 mm (0.031–0.079 in) wide. The labellum callus consists of a central ridge with two hairy side ridges. Flowering occurs from late September to early November.

== Taxonomy and naming ==
Diuris systena was first formally described in 2012 by David Jones and Lachlan Copeland in The Orchadian, from a specimen collected by Copeland near Ebor in 2006. The specific epithet (systena) means "tapering to a point", referring to the tip of the labellum mid-lobe.

== Distribution and habitat ==
New England golden moths mostly grows around the edges of swamps and in soils derived from basalt near Ebor and from granite in the Cathedral Rock National Park on the Northern Tablelands of northern New South Wales.
