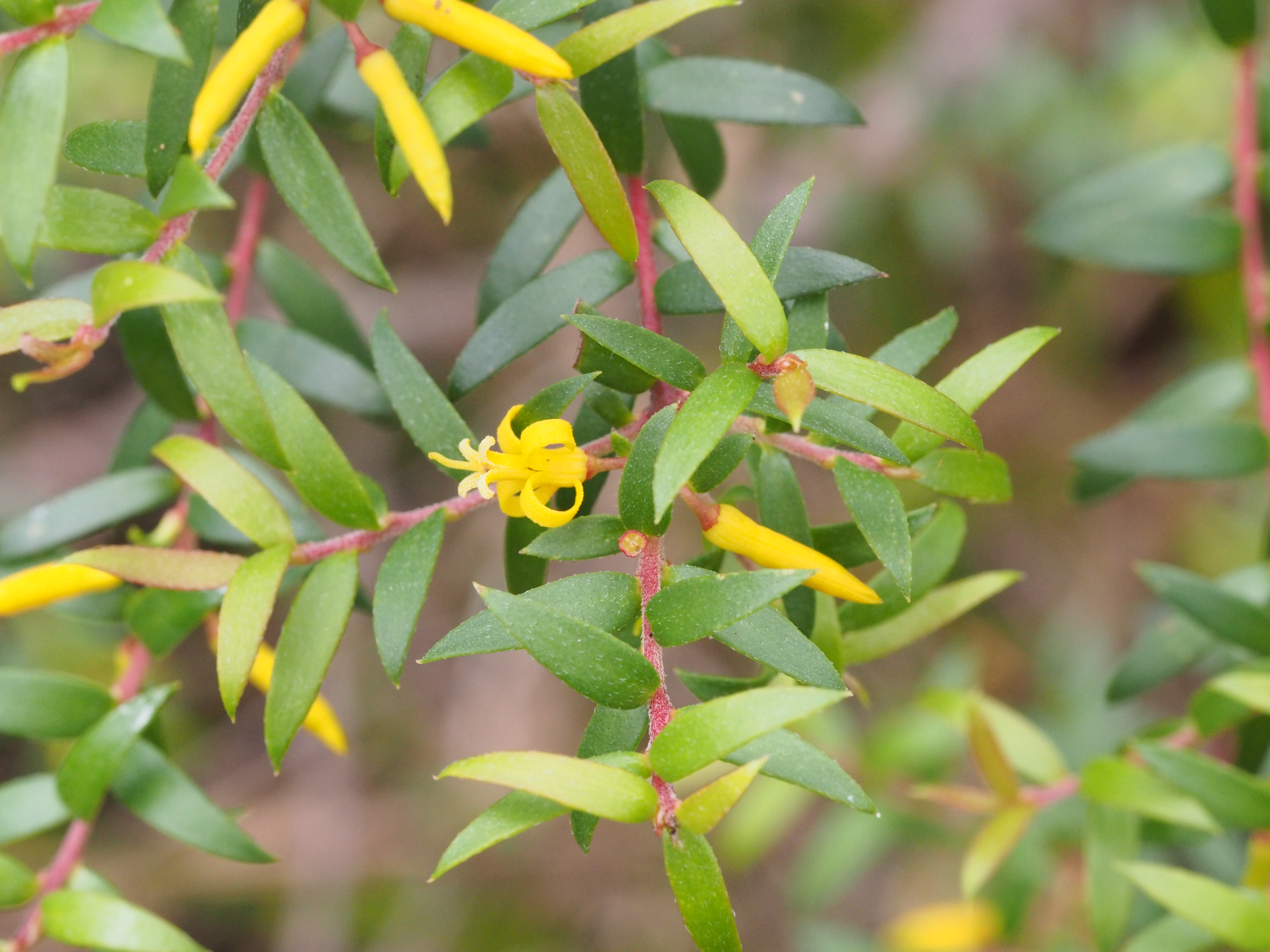
- Persoonia acuminata foliage and flowers

Scientific classification
- Kingdom: Plantae
- Clade: Tracheophytes
- Clade: Angiosperms
- Clade: Eudicots
- Order: Proteales
- Family: Proteaceae
- Genus: Persoonia
- Species: P. acuminata

Binomial name
- Persoonia acuminata L.A.S.Johnson & P.H.Weston
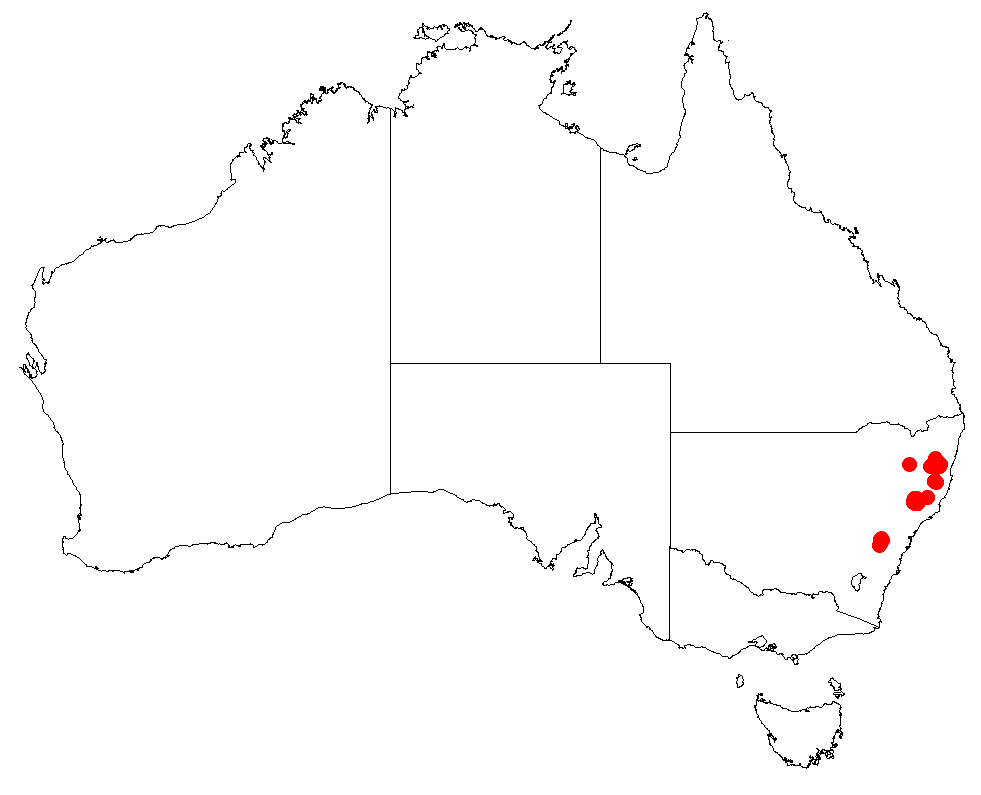
- Occurrence data from Australasian Virtual Herbarium

= Persoonia acuminata =

Species of shrub

Persoonia acuminata is a plant in the family Proteaceae and is endemic to New South Wales, Australia. It is a spreading or prostrate shrub with relatively small leaves and cylindrical yellow flowers arranged singly or in groups of up to sixteen in leaf axils or on the ends of the branches. It grows in moist forest on the higher parts of the tablelands.

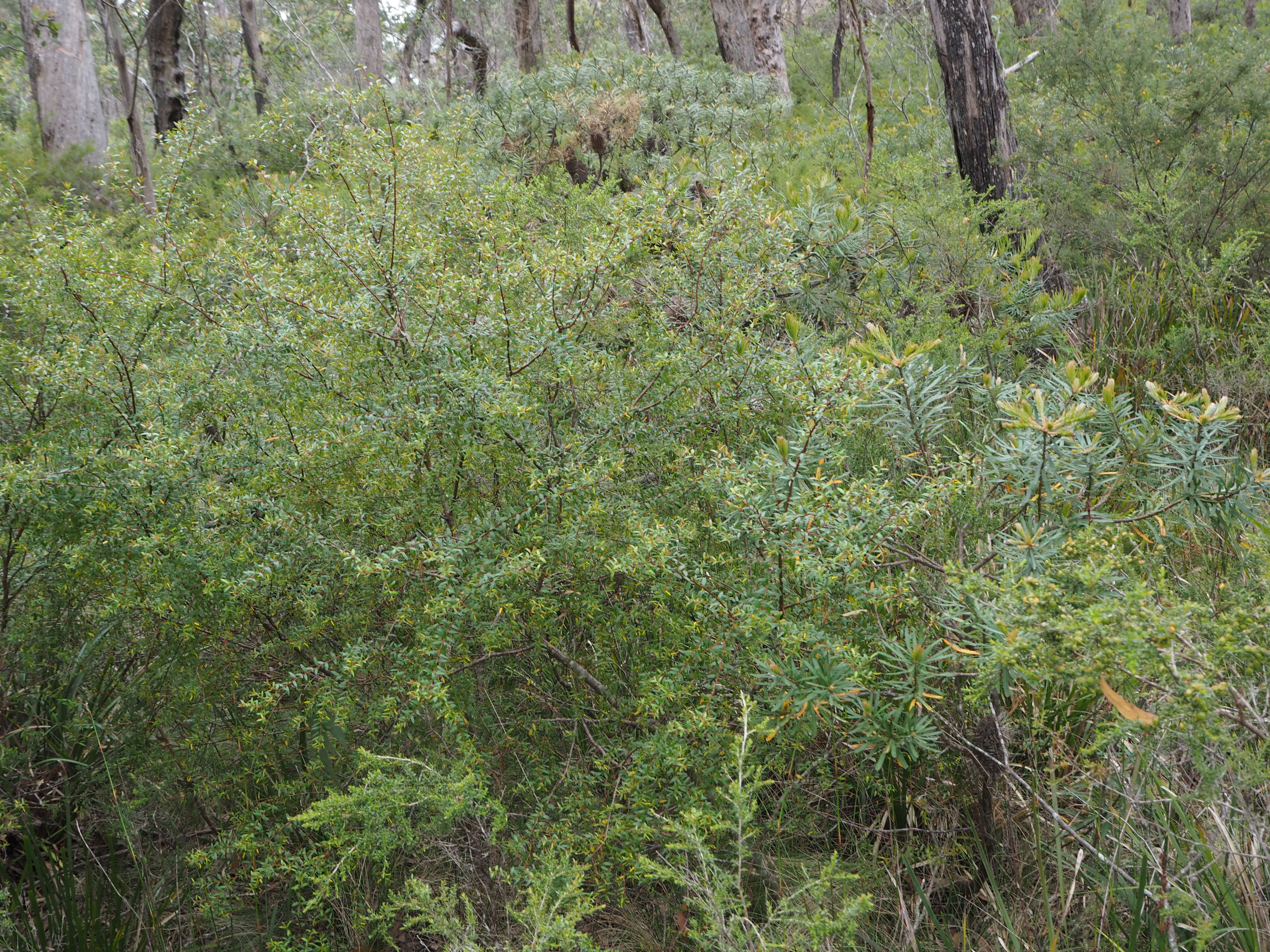
Persoonia acuminata in Cathedral Rock National Park

== Description ==
Persoonia acuminata is a prostrate to spreading shrub growing to a height of 1.7 m (6 ft) and has moderately hairy young branches, and smooth bark. The leaves are flat, broadly elliptic to egg-shaped 8–22 mm (0.3–0.9 in) long, 2.5–8.5 mm (0.1–0.3 in) wide and have a pointed end. They have a few hairs when young but usually become glabrous as they age. The upper surface is distinctly darker than the lower surface. The flowers are yellow and arranged singly or in groups of up to sixteen in leaf axils or on the ends of the branches, each flower with a glabrous pedicel 3–6 mm (0.1–0.2 in) long. The flower is composed of four tepals 7–10 mm (0.3–0.4 in) long, which are fused at the base but with the tips rolled back. The central style is surrounded by four yellow anthers which are also joined at the base with the tips rolled back, so that it resembles a cross when viewed end-on. The ovary and outside surfaces of the tepals are glabrous. Flowering occurs from December to April and is followed by fruit which are green drupes.

== Taxonomy and naming ==
Persoonia acuminata was first formally described in 1991 by Lawrie Johnson and Peter Weston from a specimen collected in the Werrikimbe National Park. The description was published in the journal Telopea. The specific epithet (acuminata) is a Latin word meaning "pointed" or "sharpened", referring to the pointed end of the leaves of this species.

== Distribution and habitat ==
This persoonia grows in heath to wet forests in soil derived from granite, basalt or metasediments but not sandstone. There are disjunct populations in the Ebor and Barrington Tops areas of the New England Tableland and the Hampton district on the Central Tablelands. It is found at altitudes of 1,000–1,500 m (3,000–5,000 ft).
