= Yooroonah Tank Barrier =

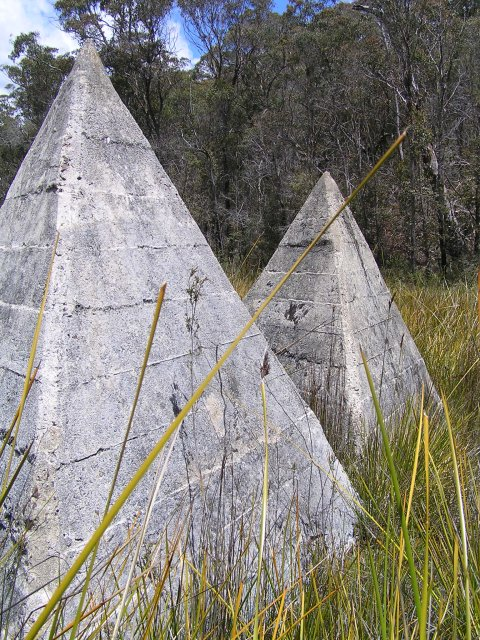
- Yooroonah Tank Barrier - Detail of concrete tetrahedra

- Location within New South Wales
- 30.4830°S 152.2818°E
- Location: Waterfall Way, Ebor, New South Wales, Australia

History
- Built: 1942–1942

Site notes
- Architect: Eastern Military Command (Australian Government)
- Owner: Office of Environment & Heritage; Transport for NSW; Rural Lands Protection Boards State Council

New South Wales Heritage Register
- Official name: Yooroonah Tank Barrier; Yooroonah Tank Traps; Ebor Tank Traps
- Type: state heritage (built)
- Designated: 27 November 2009
- Reference no.: 1803
- Type: Other - Military
- Category: Defence
- Builders: NSW Department of Main Roads, Dumersq Shire Council, local workers and miners

Yooroonah Tank Barrier is a heritage-listed former tank barrier on Waterfall Way, Ebor, New South Wales, Australia. It was designed by Eastern Military Command (Australian Government) and built in 1942 by the Department of Main Roads, the Dumaresq Shire, local workers and miners. It is also known as Yooroonah Tank Traps and Ebor Tank Traps. The property is owned by the Office of Environment & Heritage (State Government), Transport for NSW (State Government) and the Rural Lands Protection Boards State Council. It was added to the New South Wales State Heritage Register on 27 November 2009.

== History ==
With the outbreak of World War II, and Japan's entry into the conflict in 1941, Australia was feeling increasingly vulnerable to invasion by its enemies. Japan's superiority in the air and by sea made the invasion of Australia eminently possible and, with a growing national fear of such an event occurring, various defence measures were quickly planned by the government. Despite defence resources being severely limited, with shortages in skilled manpower and tools, Australia's response was to develop these defence systems and position them along its coast and tablelands.

With particular inland roads being the primary source of communication and movement of populations, stock and supplies, it became increasingly important to control access to these strategic routes in light of the threat of Japanese invasion. To do this, and slow the advance of the enemy if invasion did occur, it was decided that construction of a number of inland defence barriers and anti-tank obstacles was of critical importance to Australia's defence. Up to 50 systems were constructed in eastern NSW during this time, with eight in Dumaresq Shire Council (including the Yooroonah Tank Barrier).

In early January 1942, the Australian Military Forces Eastern Command called for the construction of these inland roadblocks to be carried out simultaneously and to commence immediately. Despite obvious urgency, the shortage of skilled labour and materials saw delays in work on the Dumaresq Shire sites, with work on the Yooroonah Barrier (T/5 and T/5A) commencing in late January.

Under the direction and instruction of the Eastern Command and the supervision of the Department of Main Roads, workers from Dumaresq Council, local miners and timber workers began construction of the barrier system with the excavation of the tunnel under the old Armidale-Ebor Road. This system was to comprise an approach trench, main tunnel shaft with two iron and concrete-lined explosive chambers (in a "T" shape, each holding 816 kg (1,799 lb) of gelignite)), road-fracture lines (lines under the road surface that were to be packed with small charges of explosives) and funk holes (small built shelters to protect personnel from the explosion should the tunnel be detonated).

Two local miners (working for 15 hours a day, six days a week) excavated the tunnel using only hand tools and small charges of gelignite. Machinery to ease the process was available but the hardness of the terrain made drilling difficult and the "fact that the excavation job was successfully completed owes much to the skill and experience of the miners". Early plans show that the tunnel measured 17 metres (55 feet 9 inches) and was built to a depth of 4 m (13 ft). Under orders from the military authorities, the excavated material was to be cleared and hidden from aerial view while the tunnel entrance was to be sealed (after being charged with 23 cm (9.1 in) thick concrete and protected by a permanent military guard. Despite these intentions, it is believed that the tunnel was never actually charged.

In April 1942, before the excavation of the tunnel was complete, work on the flanking anti-tank barrier (T/5A) had commenced. This supporting system was to consist of concrete tetrahedra and five sections of wooden posts in parallel rows.

Although the construction and lining of the tunnel was complete, the explosives had been ordered and the flanking ground-cover barrier was underway, a halt was called on any further progress on the site in May 1942, pending an enquiry into the strategic effectiveness of the barrier system. The system was only going to be successful if there was no alternative route that allowed the invading force to avoid the complex completely. During an inspection of the site by the military authorities, an older superseded section of road was discovered that would allow the enemy to skirt the barrier entirely. Despite the poor site choice, valuable resources of time, money and supplies had already been spent on the barrier system and, by July 1942, it was resolved to continue with its construction.

To protect this newly discovered access point via the superseded road, the wooden barrier system was extended across what is now Waterfall Way ('Southern Block'). This section then ran from this point up to the crest of the ridge overlooking the old mined Armidale-Ebor Road (the "Central" and '75 Blocks'). While the mined roadway is largely protected on its eastern side by the steep ridge, to the west the landscape drops away into a gully with a marshy creek at the bottom and, to protect this section of the site, the "Tunnel Block" was constructed and extended from the roadside to a rocky outcrop, midway to the creek. From here, the last section of wooden posts were installed and reached to the edge of the creek. However, being timber, it was not feasible to install any posts in the waterlogged marshland and the solution, to protect this potential access point, was the installation of concrete tetrahedra.

Although early plans indicate 20 tetrahedra were anticipated for the site, these designs underwent changes (perhaps as a result of shortages in resources or the realisation of the poor choice in site) and only two rows of four tetrahedra were installed in the marshland, at the foot of the gully. Poured on-site, the 1.5m-high tetrahedra were laced together with an anchor cable and set into the ground to a depth of 30 cm (12 in). Each tetrahedra was poured in 11 layers (approximately 14 cm thick), topped with a hand-shaped cone and rendered with cement. Following the installation of the tetrahedra in October 1942, the construction of the Yooroonah Tank Barrier was officially complete.

While constructing the barriers and managing the site following its completion, the local workers and servicemen constructed a number of crude buildings and outposts across the landscape to enable them to occupy the site within view of the barriers but without attracting the attention of invading forces. A "quarters" building and small hut were constructed south-west of the site, downstream from the barrier complex, and the remnants indicate they were timber-framed and may have been canvas-walled. However, the "quarters" were possibly more substantial with evidence of a fireplace and chimney. The local workmen also constructed various stone lookouts at strategic points throughout the landscape and along the ridgeline, overlooking the road.

Although the planning and construction of man-made barriers, alongside the natural obstacles of the landscape, was an important defence effort to guard inland strategic roads against the national threat of invasion during the war, the Yooroonah Tank Barrier was never used.

=== Comparisons with other NSW tank trap barrier systems ===
The survival of the Yooroonah Tank Barrier site, in its intact form, is rare in terms of other World War II tank barrier systems in NSW. Approximately 50 barrier complexes were built in eastern NSW during the war but most were dismantled or removed soon after the conflict ended. Being a complex of timber and concrete barriers and a mined explosives tunnel is also rare as most of the other surviving barriers are made up of concrete tetrahedra only. Other tank barrier systems in NSW include the following:

- Port Kembla Heritage Park, relocated from Lake Illawarra (deep trench, timber post barriers submerged in Mullet Creek and concrete tetrahedra relocated to outside Breakwater Battery Museum)
- Smith's Lake, Great Lakes (concrete tetrahedra on the banks of the lake)
- Paddy's Flat on Clarence River, near Tenterfield (concrete post obstacles)
- Mount Lindesay Road, Tenterfield (timber post obstacles)
- Stockton Beach, Newcastle (concrete tetrahedra and rectangular slabs on the beach, can sometimes be covered by sand or partially exposed. Other tetrahedra have been removed and relocated around car park)
- Dee Why Lagoon (concrete tetrahedra)

Compared to these alternative complexes, the Yooroonah Tank Barrier is rare in NSW as a representative of an inland defence system, rather than a coastal barrier. The site is also rare as one of the most intact complexes of defence barriers, in terms of number of elements, their relative intactness and the demonstrated relationship between them. Having been isolated by the construction of the bypass road, following its construction, the Yooroonah barrier complex has also been largely protected from disturbance or deterioration by non-natural forces, ensuring its survival in its current form.

== Description ==
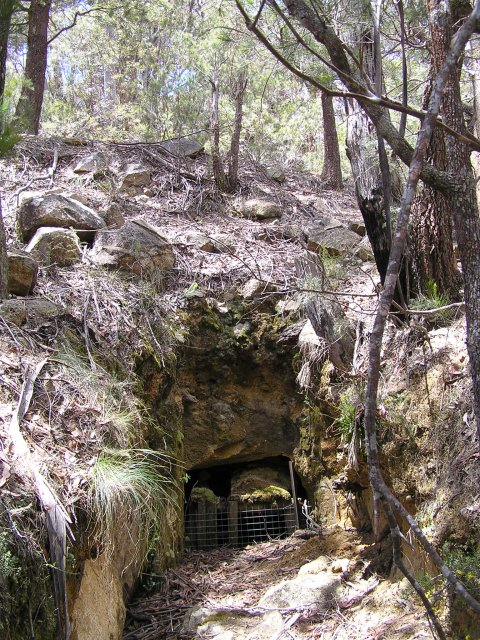
Trench and entrance to mined explosives tunnel (under Old Armidale-Ebor Road)

Located in the New England Tablelands, some 67 km east of Armidale and 12 km southwest of Ebor, the Yooroonah Tank Trap Barrier is positioned across the old Armidale-Ebor Road and stretches from Waterfall Way, through the Travelling Stock Route to the southern boundary of the Cathedral Rock National Park and into the Wilderness Area. The site consists of a number of built structures and modifications to the natural landscape, including:

- "Southern Block" (wooden post barrier, approximately 10m south of Waterfall Way)
- "75 Block" (wooden post barrier stretching from Waterfall Way to 'Central Block')
- "Central Block" (wooden post barrier stretching from "75 Block" to stone lookout on the ridgeline)
- Stone lookout (small crescent shaped wall on the ridgeline overlooking the, now disused, roadway)
- Tunnel and access trench (excavated under old Armidale-Ebor Road)
- "Tunnel Block" (wooden post barrier stretching west from old Armidale-Ebor Road and mined tunnel to rocky outcrop, midway to creek)
- "Northern Block" (wooden post barrier between rocky outcrop and edge of creek)
- Eight concrete tetrahedra (two rows of four, in a staggered placement)
- "Quarters" (large wooden-framed structure with fireplace and chimney)
- 2 x small huts (wooden-framed structures)

The tunnel entry still shows rusted hinge elements on either side.

The quantity of timber post barriers far outnumbers any other barrier system on the site (e.g. tetrahedra). Possibly a shortage in time and resources was a reason for this or perhaps, being near a heavily forested area, timber was more readily available for the installation of wooden posts as a defensive barrier. The lack of evidence of timber off-cuts or tree stumps on the site does indicate that the timber used was sourced away from the barrier site. Compared to its surroundings, this site was more lightly landscaped and logging would have created a more noticeable difference to approaching forces. Once at the site, the wooden posts were sunk in near-to parallel lines in square patterns, approximately 180 cm apart but the solid underground rock appears to have prevented placement of some of the posts, explaining some of the more random positioning.

Presently, many of these wooden posts remain in situ. However, some sections have been affected by wood rot or have been burnt by bushfires. It is believed the wood used for the piles is Blackbutt and Stringybark and it appears the Blackbutt is more resilient to fire and has survived better than the Stringybark posts.

To support these wooden barriers, are eight concrete tetrahedra (two rows of four), positioned in the Wilderness Area of the Cathedral Rock National Park. The marshland is an important landform in the National Park and the installation of these permanent concrete structures was an effort to prevent enemy tanks traversing the marshland during its drier periods. The eight tetrahedra in place are approximately 1.5m high and remain in good condition, despite some deterioration to the external render. Evidence suggests the tetrahedra were cast on site in 11 layers (reinforced with steel mesh) and topped with hand-shaped cones (with some variation in height).

At the centre of the Yooroonah Tank Barrier site is the excavated tunnel under the old Armidale-Ebor Road. This tunnel was excavated to a depth of approximately four metres, in a "T" shape, with an open access trench (west of the road), main shaft and two outlying chambers to hold the explosive charges. Road-fracture lines (built under the road surface that were to be packed with small charges of explosives) and funk holes (small built shelters to protect personnel from the explosion should the tunnel be detonated) were also installed above the tunnel, on the surface. The total length of the mined tunnel is reported to be 17 metres (55 feet 9 inches) and, although it has been sealed off from public access with a metal grill, the tunnel appears to be relatively intact.

The site also contains a number of structures and lookout points built for the workers and servicemen to occupy the site during, and after, its construction. Situated downstream from the tetrahedra barrier in the National Park, are the remains of small wooden-framed structures, containing remnants of domestic activities. The "quarters" is the larger of the structures with evidence of a substantial fireplace and chimney. There is also a smaller, crude wooden-framed structure (possibly canvas-walled) in the vicinity and another closer to the open trench to the tunnel. These structures all have a line-of-sight to the barrier complex but are concealed from view to any approaching enemy forces.

The post-World War II construction of the bypass road (the current Waterfall Way), although cutting through some of the wooden barriers, has largely isolated and protected the complex from non-natural causes of deterioration. However, the integrity of the site has been somewhat compromised in recent years. Some unauthorised work to create an access way was carried out in an effort to increase public use of this site. The path extends from the mined road to the tetrahedra barrier in the marshland and cuts very close to the wooden post barrier and, in doing so, has caused some archaeological damage.

=== Condition ===
The timber post barriers are suffering from some fire damage and wood rot. The excavated tunnel and concrete tetrahedra are in good condition. The site has high archaeological potential.

The principle elements of the site are intact. The tunnel and concrete tetrahedra are in good condition but the timber post barriers have some wood rot and fire damage. There was some disturbance at the south eastern section of the site when the bypass was constructed (now Waterfall Way) but, although this development cut through some of the wooden barriers, it has largely isolated and protected the complex from non-natural causes of deterioration.

The integrity of the site, however, has been somewhat compromised in recent years. In 2004, some unauthorised work to create an access way, in an effort to increase public use of this site, was carried out. The path extends from the mined road to the tetrahedra barrier in the marshland and cuts very close to the wooden post barrier and, in doing so, has caused some archaeological damage.

== Heritage listing ==
The Yooroonah Tank Barrier has State significance as one of the last inland and most intact complexes of tank barrier systems in NSW, surviving from World War II. Built in 1942, the construction of this inland defence complex came as a response to the national threat of Australia's invasion by Japanese enemy forces. This site is significant as it demonstrates the relationship between the federal, state and local governments who, by working with the community, built this barrier to protect inland NSW against the common enemy during World War II. The Yooroonah Tank Barrier was one of approximately 50 defence complexes built in eastern NSW and its survival in its current, largely-intact, state is rare in NSW. The complex is also significant for the relationship between the components of the site, these being the wooden post barriers, concrete tetrahedra and the excavated tunnel under the former road (to be detonated should an enemy approach).

Yooroonah Tank Barrier was listed on the New South Wales State Heritage Register on 27 November 2009 having satisfied the following criteria.

The place is important in demonstrating the course, or pattern, of cultural or natural history in New South Wales.

The Yooroonah Tank Barrier has State significance as one of the last inland and most intact complexes of tank barrier systems in NSW, surviving from World War II. Built in 1942, the construction of this inland defence complex came as a response to the national threat of Australia's invasion by Japanese enemy forces. This site is significant as it demonstrates the relationship between the federal (Eastern Military Command), state (Main Roads Department) and local (Dumaresq Shire) governments who, by working with the community, built this barrier to protect inland NSW against the common enemy during World War II. Despite the national fear of invasion and statewide efforts to construct these defence barriers quickly, the Yooroonah complex was not used. It is also argued that, due to a halt in the construction of the tunnel after the bypass route was discovered, the explosive chambers of the mined tunnel were never charged.

The place has a strong or special association with a person, or group of persons, of importance of cultural or natural history of New South Wales's history.

The Yooroonah Tank Barrier has local significance for its association with workers and miners from the community who constructed the complex under the direction of the Eastern Military Command and under the supervision of the Main Roads Department. The relationship between the three levels of government (federal, state and local) and the community demonstrated the unity of the war effort against the common enemy.

The place is important in demonstrating aesthetic characteristics and/or a high degree of creative or technical achievement in New South Wales.

The Yooroonah Tank Barrier has State significance for the aesthetic and technical qualities of the site's layout and components. Set amongst a natural landscape of diverse and rare vegetation, the different built elements of this site demonstrate the technical achievement of the design and construction of the complex. The relationship between the man-made defence barriers (the excavated tunnel and the wooden and concrete barriers) and the natural obstacles of the surrounding environment reflect the intuitive thinking behind the design. The eight concrete tetrahedra, grounded in the marshland of the creek, are the most aesthetically outstanding feature of the site, with this group of angular, pyramid-like structures rising out of the natural landscape.

The place has strong or special association with a particular community or cultural group in New South Wales for social, cultural or spiritual reasons.

The Yooroonah Tank Barrier has social significance to the local community, as an example of the community's efforts against the national threat of invasion during World War II. The Australian government (Eastern Military Command) ordered the construction of a number of defence systems, including the Yooroonah complex, to be constructed by Dumaresq Shire (with local tradesmen and miners) under the supervision of the Main Roads Department. This relationship, across all levels of government, saw the involvement of the local community at a time when there were severe shortages of manpower and resources in NSW. The site also has contemporary social significance to local community groups who have, in recent years, made efforts to increase public acknowledgement and use of the site.

The place has potential to yield information that will contribute to an understanding of the cultural or natural history of New South Wales.

The Yooroonah Tanks Barrier has State significance for its potential to reveal information about the design, construction and function of inland tank-barriers during World War II. The construction of these complexes was a response to the national fear of Australia's invasion by enemy forces and, as a surviving example of one of the, approximately, 50 complexes built in eastern NSW, the Yooroonah site has the potential to reveal further evidence about the philosophy behind this method of defence. Further analysis of the site could reveal information about the relationship between the different sections of the complex (the tunnel and concrete and wooden barriers) and the remnants of the "quarters" and huts may also explain how the site was operated and what life on the site may have been like.

The place possesses uncommon, rare or endangered aspects of the cultural or natural history of New South Wales.

The Yooroonah Tanks Barrier has State significance for its rarity value because it is one of the last remaining and most intact complexes of inland defence systems in NSW (dating from World War II). Out of approximately 50 barrier systems constructed in eastern NSW during this period, the majority of these complexes were removed, dismantled, destroyed or modified after the war but the isolation and limited public access to the Yooroonah site has ensured its survival and preservation. The survival of the tunnel, explosives chamber and the collection of concrete and timber post obstacles are rare physical evidence of how man-made barriers, alongside the obstacles of the natural environment, were used as a defensive system during the war. Having never been used and surviving largely-intact, the site can also still demonstrate the principle characteristics and functions of this type of World War II defence system in NSW. As a surviving inland barrier, the Yooroonah site is also rare in NSW as other tank obstacle complexes (including sites in Wollongong, Great Lakes, Tenterfield, Dee Why and Newcastle) do exist but are largely located in coastal areas (see History - Comparisons with other NSW tank trap barrier systems).

The place is important in demonstrating the principal characteristics of a class of cultural or natural places/environments in New South Wales.

The Yooroonah Tank Barrier has State significance as a representative example of an inland defence system from World War II. With a growing national fear of invasion by Japanese enemy forces during the war, Australia's response was to develop defensive barriers and anti-tank obstacles along the coast and on strategically important inland routes. Approximately 50 barriers were constructed in eastern NSW (eight in Dumaresq Shire) and the Yooroonah Tank Barrier is one of the largest and most intact examples remaining in NSW. Most barrier systems were removed, dismantled, destroyed or modified after the war and the survival of the Yooroonah site is largely due to its isolation and limited public access (a bypass road was constructed after the war, which has been a significant contributing factor to the protection of the site). The siting, layout and physical fabric of the site also represent the principle characteristics of inland defence systems in World War II and demonstrate the key functions and operations of the complex during this period.
