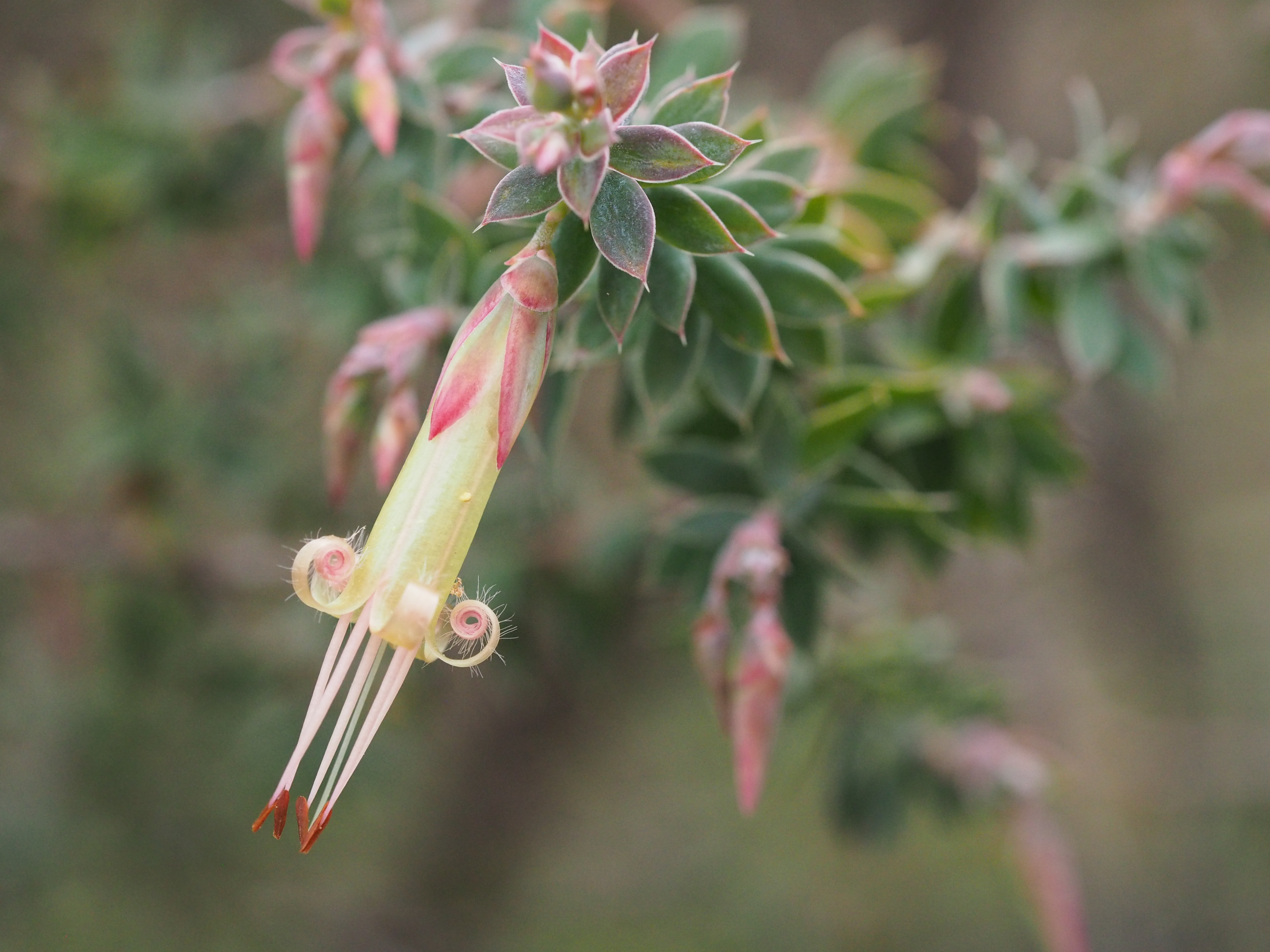

Conservation status
- Vulnerable (EPBC Act)

Scientific classification
- Kingdom: Plantae
- Clade: Tracheophytes
- Clade: Angiosperms
- Clade: Eudicots
- Clade: Asterids
- Order: Ericales
- Family: Ericaceae
- Genus: Styphelia
- Species: S. perileuca

Binomial name
- Styphelia perileuca J.M.Powell

= Styphelia perileuca =

Montane green five-corners

Species of flowering plant

Styphelia perileuca, commonly known as montane green five-corners, is a plant in the heath family Ericaceae and is endemic to New South Wales. It is an erect, spreading shrub with broad leaves with a spiky tip, and yellowish-green and red tube-shaped flowers with the petals rolled back. It is only known from the eastern edge of the New England Tableland.

== Description ==
Styphelia perileuca is a spreading shrub which grows up to 3 m (10 ft) tall and wide. Its leaves are mostly broadly elliptic in shape, 6–12 mm (0.2–0.5 in) long, 3–5 mm (0.1–0.2 in) wide, slightly dished with very fine teeth along the edge and a sharp point on the tip. The flowers are tube-shaped, yellowish green in colour with fine red stripes and hang singly from upper leaf axils. There are five glabrous sepals 9–10 mm (0.35–0.39 in) long. The five petals are joined, forming a tube 12–14 mm (0.5–0.6 in) long with the tips of the petals rolled back and hairy on the inside surface. The stamens are straight and extend beyond the end of the petal tube. Flowering occurs mostly between September and January but flowers are also present in April.

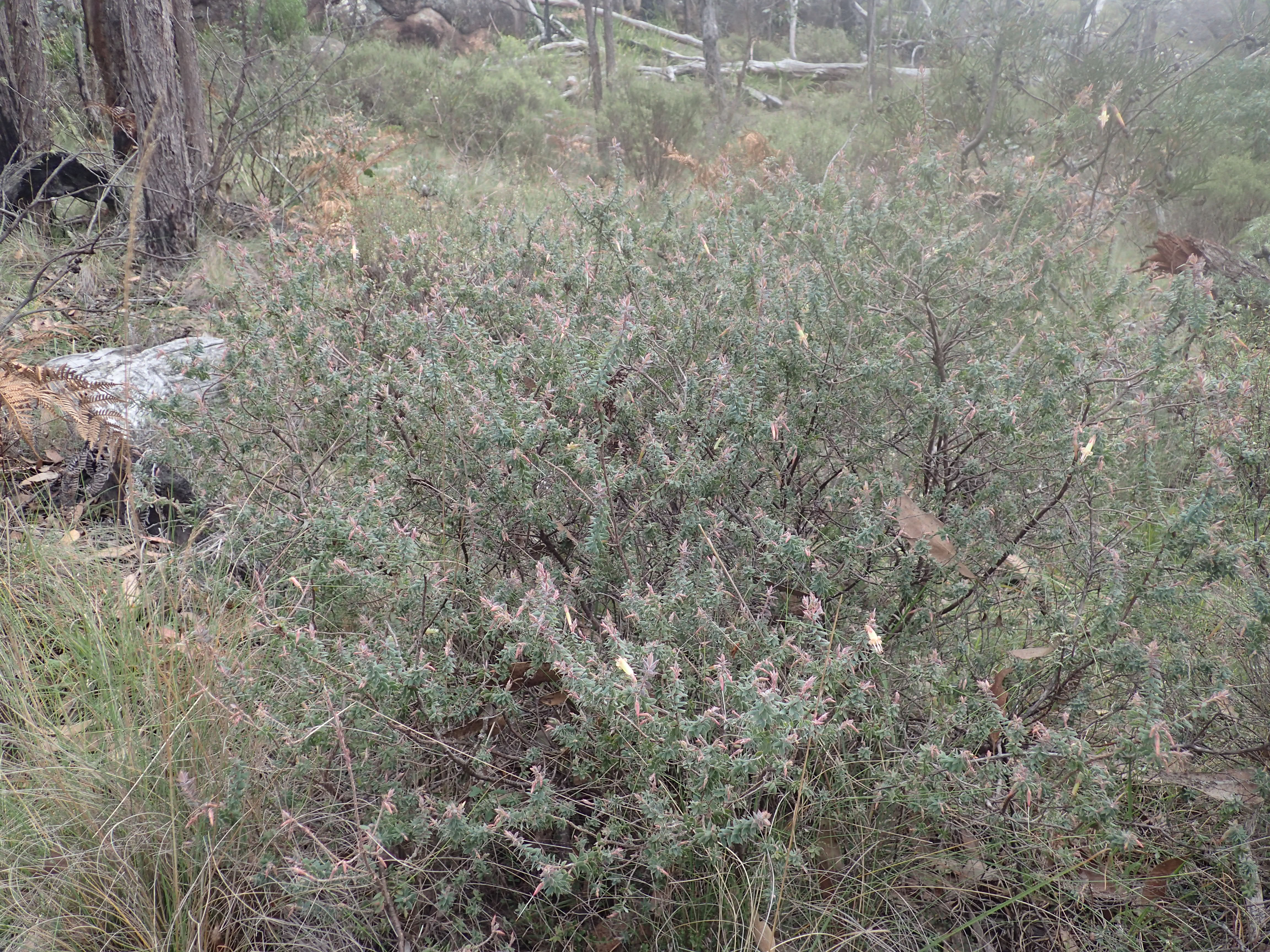
Habit in Cathedral Rock National Park

== Taxonomy and naming ==
Styphelia perileuca was first formally described in 1992 by Jocelyn Powell and published in Telopea. The specific epithet (perileuca) is derived from the Ancient Greek words peri meaning "around" and leukos meaning "white" referring to the thin white perimeter of the leaves.

== Distribution and habitat ==
Montane green five-corners is only known from Cathedral Rock National Park, the New England National Park and near Maclean. It grows in shrubland near swamps and in forest.

== Conservation ==
Styphelia perileuca is classified as "vulnerable" under the Australian Government Environment Protection and Biodiversity Conservation Act 1999 and the New South Wales Government Biodiversity Conservation Act 2016. The main threats to the species are its small population size and narrow distribution.
