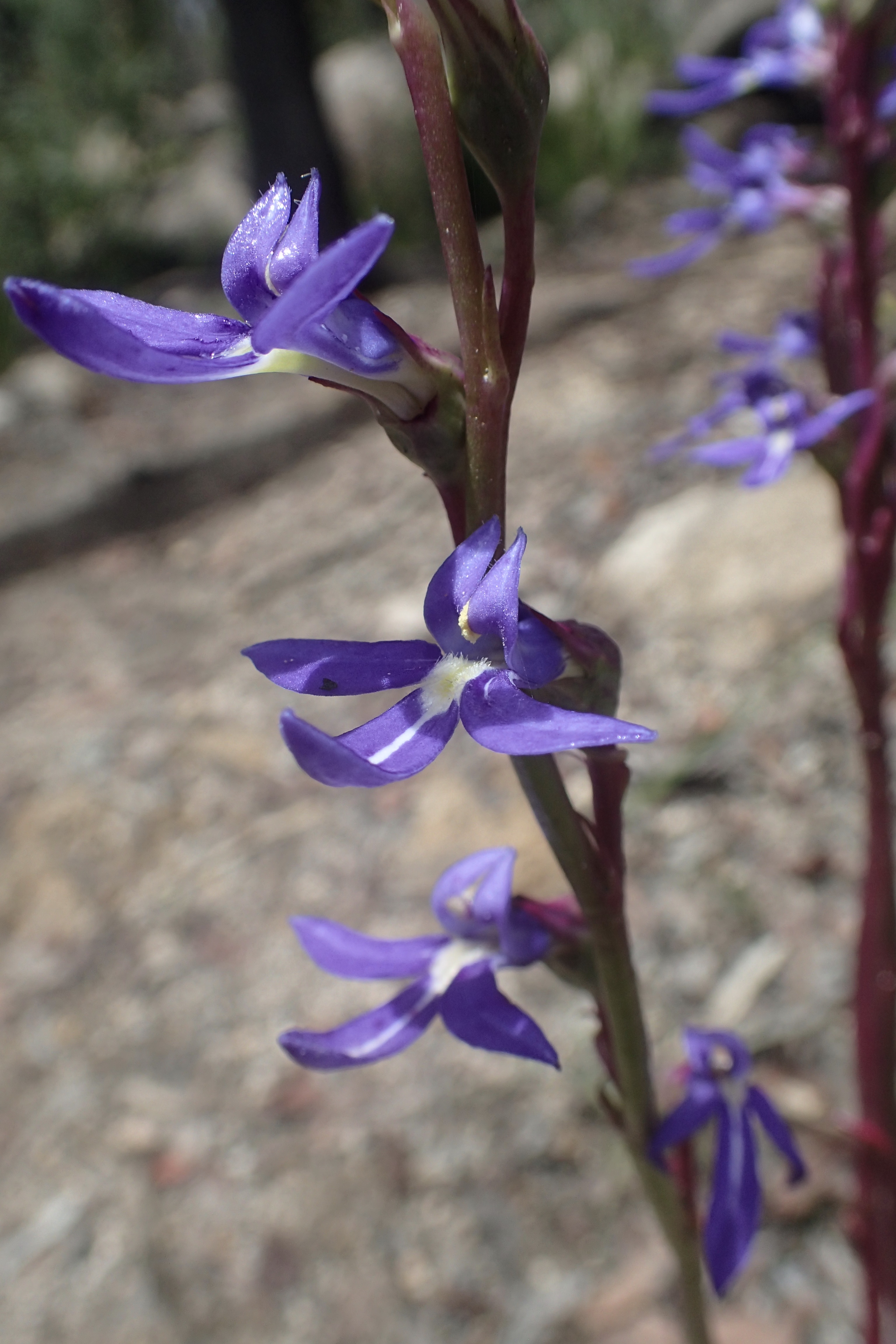
- In Cathedral Rock National Park

Scientific classification
- Kingdom: Plantae
- Clade: Tracheophytes
- Clade: Angiosperms
- Clade: Eudicots
- Clade: Asterids
- Order: Asterales
- Family: Campanulaceae
- Genus: Lobelia
- Species: L. browniana

Binomial name
- Lobelia browniana Schult.

Synonyms
- Lobelia gibbosa var. browniana F.M.Bailey nom. inval., nom. subnud.; Lobelia gibbosa var. browniana (Schult.) F.M.Bailey; Lobelia gibbosa var. browniana (Schult.) Maiden & Betche isonym; Lobelia stricta R.Br. nom. illeg.; Rapuntium brownianum (Schult.) C.Presl

= Lobelia browniana =

Species of flowering plant

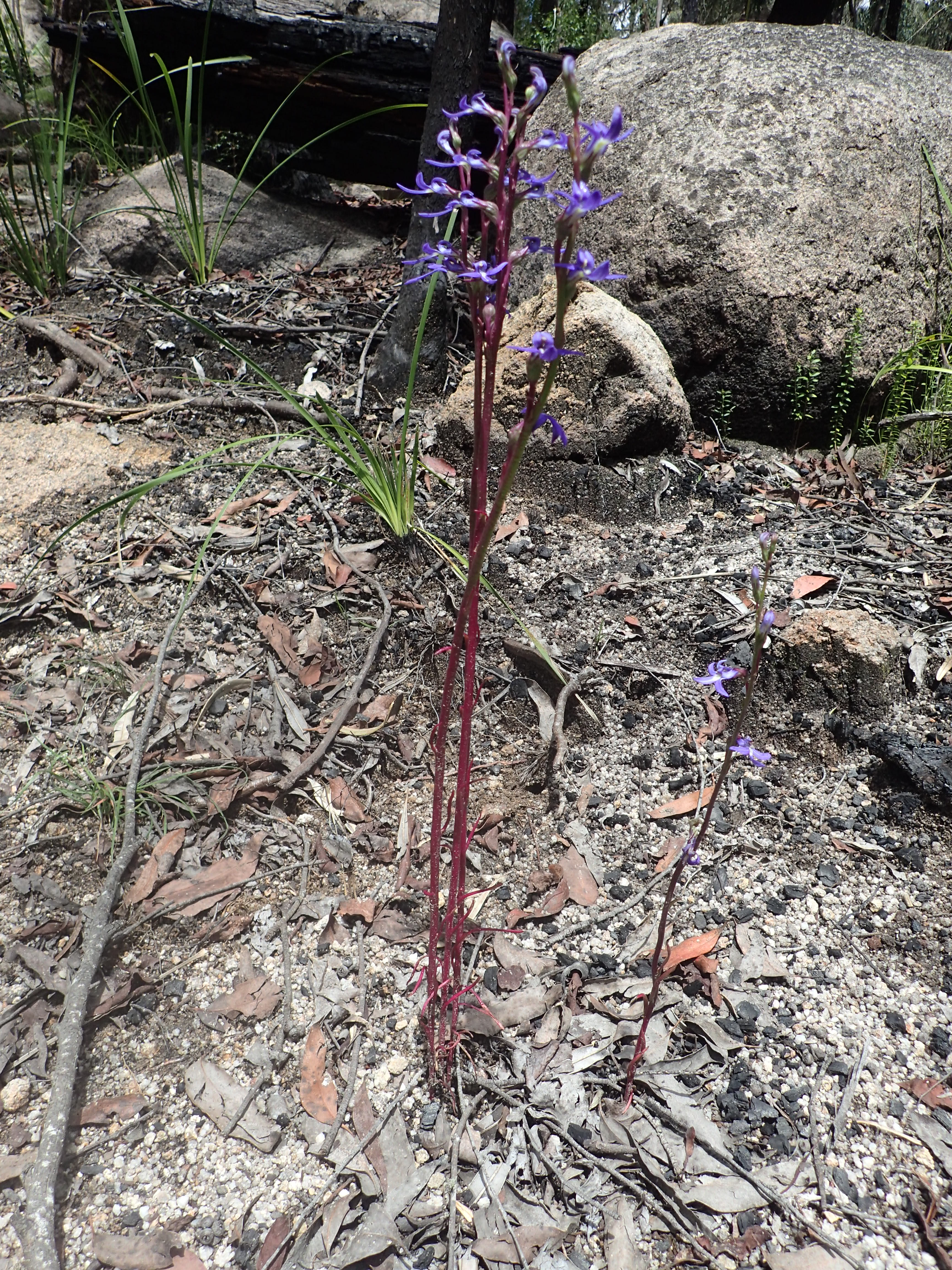
Habit

Lobelia browniana is a species of flowering plant in the family Campanulaceae and is endemic to eastern Australia. It is an erect, glabrous, annual plant with narrow leaves and one-sided racemes of blue flowers with long, soft hairs in the centre.

== Description ==
Lobelia browniana is an erect, succulent or semi-succulent annual herb that typically grows to a height of up to 50 cm (20 in) and often has reddish stems and only a few leaves. The leaves are linear to narrow lance-shaped with the narrower end towards the base, 3–60 m (9.8–196.9 ft) long and 0.2–4.5 mm (0.0079–0.1772 in) wide. The flowers are borne in one-sided racemes, each flower on a pedicel usually 2–14 mm (0.079–0.551 in) long. The sepals are 1.3–3.0 mm (0.051–0.118 in) long, the petals blue and 9–14 mm (0.35–0.55 in) long with two lips. The centre lobe of the lower lip is the longest at 5.2–8.5 mm (0.20–0.33 in). Flowering occurs from November to February and the fruit is an elliptic to oblong capsule 5–12 mm (0.20–0.47 in) long.

== Taxonomy ==
Lobelia browniana was first formally described in 1819 by Josef August Schultes in Systema Vegetabilium. The taxon had been given the name Lobelia stricta in 1810 by Robert Brown but the name was illegitimate.

== Distribution and habitat ==
This lobelia grows in forest and woodland in scattered locations in New South Wales, Victoria, South Australia, Queensland and Tasmania.
