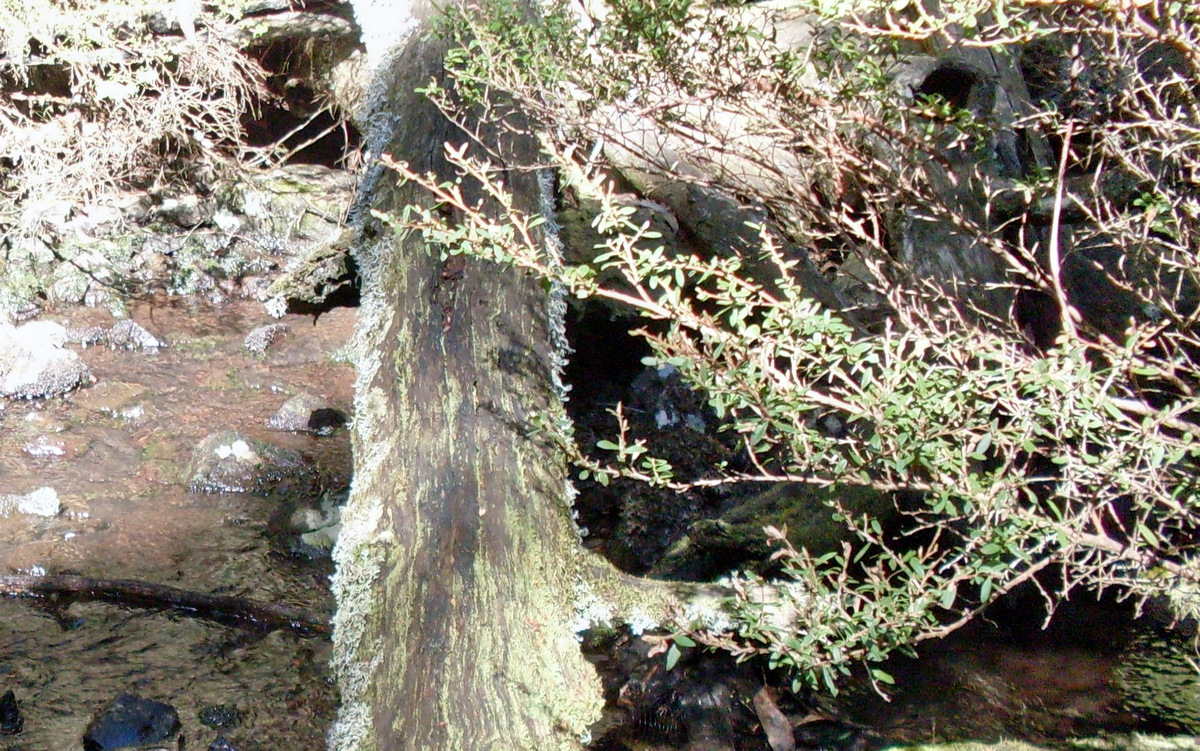

Scientific classification
- Kingdom: Plantae
- Clade: Tracheophytes
- Clade: Angiosperms
- Clade: Eudicots
- Clade: Rosids
- Order: Myrtales
- Family: Myrtaceae
- Genus: Leptospermum
- Species: L. polygalifolium
- Subspecies: L. p. subsp. montanum

Trinomial name
- Leptospermum polygalifolium subsp. montanum Joy Thomps.

Synonyms
- Leptospermum flavescens Sm. (sensu lato)

= Leptospermum polygalifolium subsp. montanum =

Mountain tea tree

Subspecies of tree

Leptospermum polygalifolium subsp. montanum known as the mountain tea tree or tantoon is a shrub or small tree found in eastern Australia. The original specimen was collected in 1912 near Yarrowitch. This plant is a sub-species of the Tantoon of the Myrtle family. It resembles other plants commonly referred to as "tea trees" or "paperbarks". The sub-species term montanum refers to its habitat of high altitudes. Polygalifolium is derived from Latin, referring to the resemblance of the leaves to certain members of the Polygala.

== Habitat ==
It grows at the heads of mountain streams, or in rocky areas within crevices with shallow soils, often derived from granite or basalt. Usually seen in relatively fire free areas at high altitude in rainforests or rainforest margins north of the Barrington Tops region. The most northerly recording is at Mount Cordeaux.

== Description ==
Usually seen as a shrub, one to seven metres tall. Though at Mount Hyland Nature Reserve it grows to 25 metres tall and a stem diameter of 56 cm. The trunk is not regular, with vertical flutings, particularly near the base. Bark is papery on older trees, greyish or pale brown. New branchlets are thin with soft silky hairs. Leaves are alternate on the stem, 10 to 15 mm long, 3 to 5 mm wide, usually with a blunt point. Leaf margins curl over, dark green above, paler below the leaf. Silky hairs appear on the young leaves. Leaves are reverse lanceolate to elliptic in shape. Leaf stems short or indistinct. Oil dots easily noticed under a lens. Only the midrib is visible on the bottom surface of the leaf.

Single white flowers form from October to January, 12 mm in diameter. The hypanthium is around 3.5 mm long, the sepals around 2 mm long. The fruit is a grey hemispherical capsule with a flat base, 6 to 9 mm in diameter. The capsule stalk is 2 to 3 mm long. When opening, the capsule reveals five widely spreading valves. Fruit matures from October to April.
