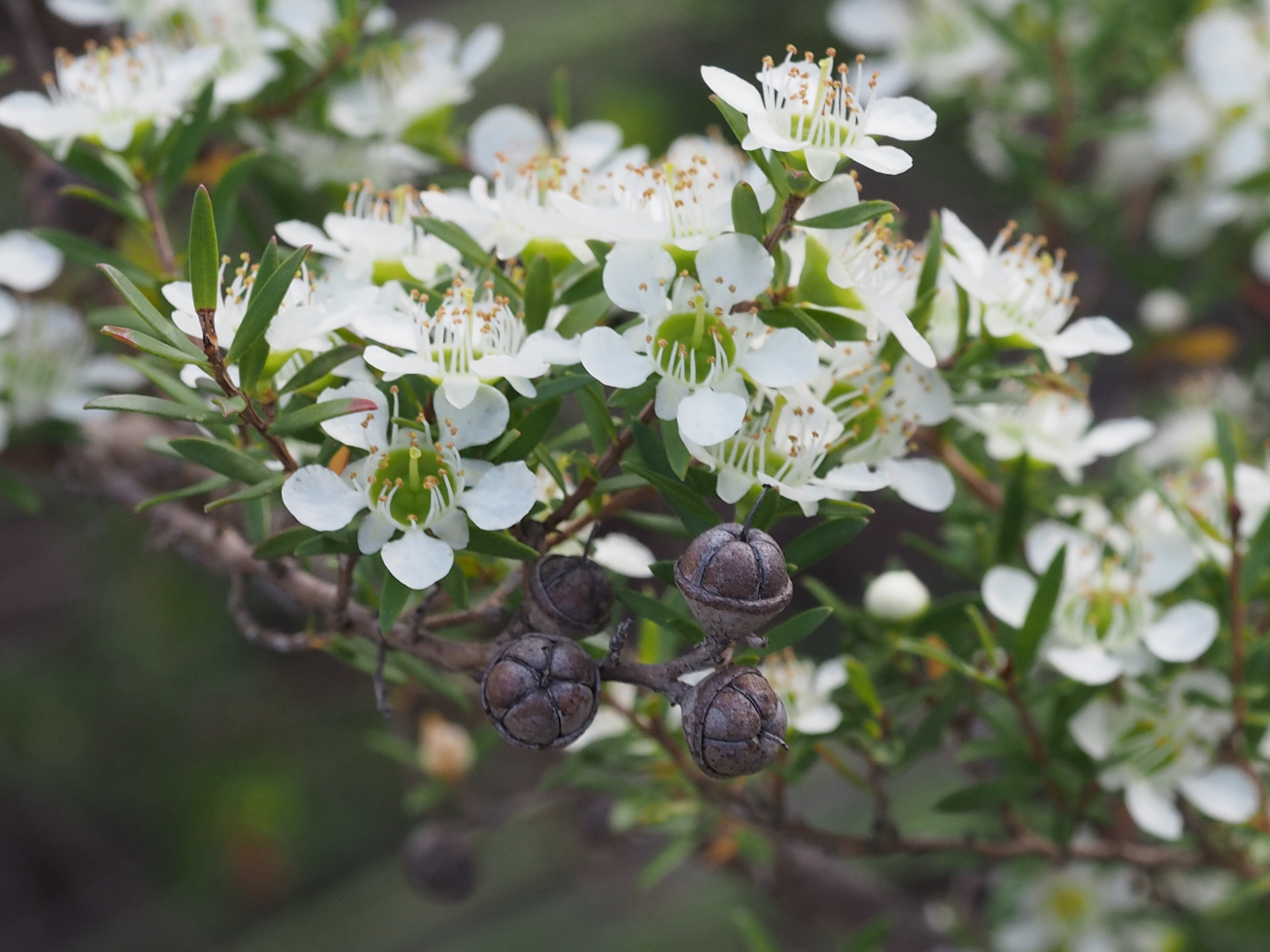
- In Sherwood Nature Reserve

Scientific classification
- Kingdom: Plantae
- Clade: Tracheophytes
- Clade: Angiosperms
- Clade: Eudicots
- Clade: Rosids
- Order: Myrtales
- Family: Myrtaceae
- Genus: Leptospermum
- Species: L. polygalifolium
- Subspecies: L. p. subsp. cismontanum

Trinomial name
- Leptospermum polygalifolium subsp. cismontanum Joy Thomps.

Synonyms
- Leptospermum flavescens var. leptophyllum Cheel; Leptospermum flavescens var. microphyllum Benth.

= Leptospermum polygalifolium subsp. cismontanum =

Tantoon

Subspecies of flowering plant

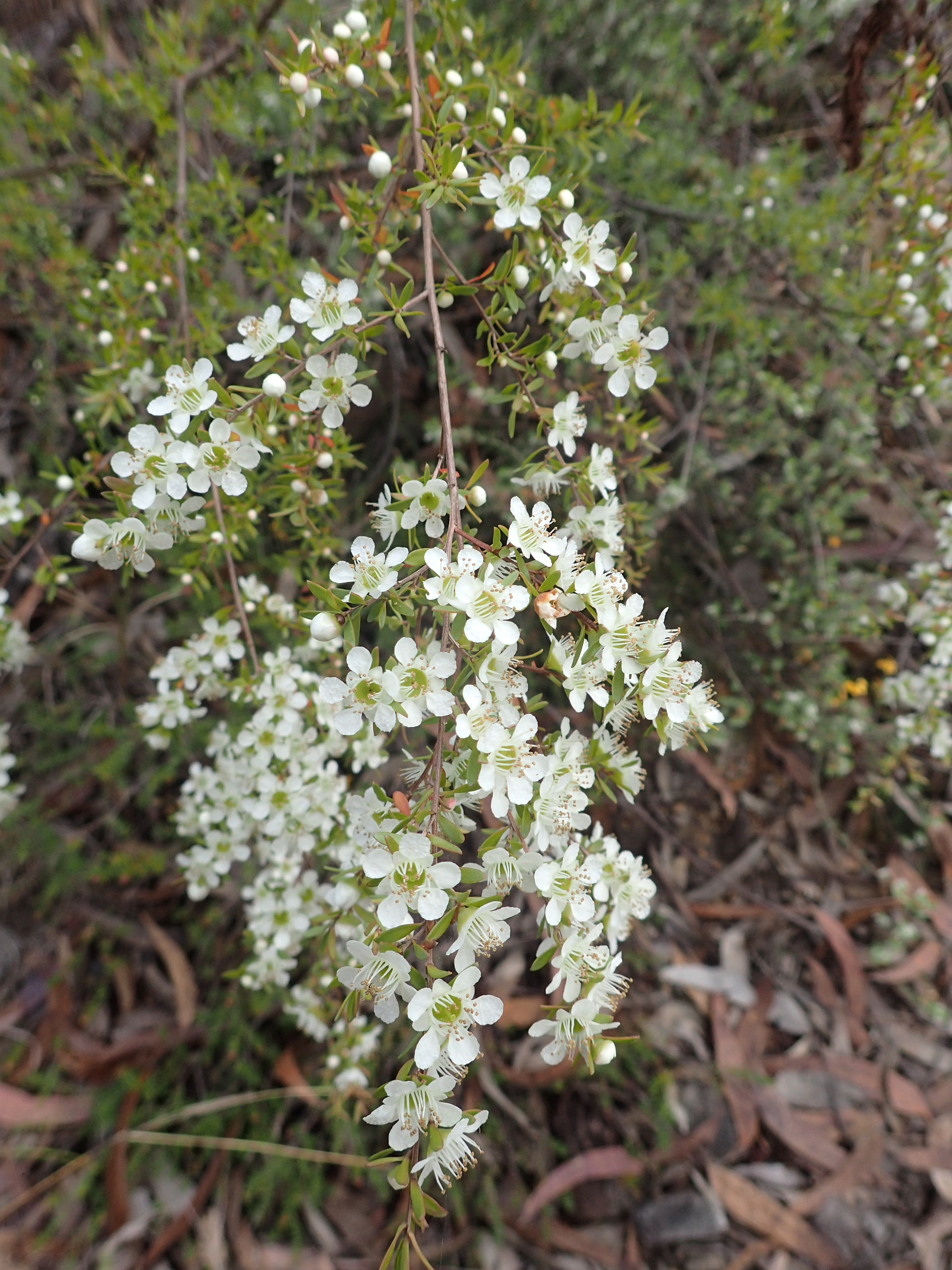
Habit

Leptospermum polygalifolium subsp. cismontanum, commonly known as tantoon, is a subspecies of flowering plant in the family Myrtaceae and is endemic to near-coastal areas of eastern Australia. It is a shrub or small tree with elliptical leaves and white flowers in spring.

== Description ==
Leptospermum polygalifolium subsp. cismontanum is a shrub that typically grows to a height of 1 m (3 ft 3 in), sometimes a slender tree to 4 m (13 ft). Its leaves are elliptical, sometimes broader in the upper part, dull green but paler on the lower surface, usually 8–10 mm (0.31–0.39 in) long and 2 mm (0.079 in) wide with the edges tending to turn downwards. The flowers are white, about 10 mm (0.39 in) in diameter with a hypanthium 2.5–3 mm (0.098–0.118 in) long. The sepals are 1.5–2 mm (0.059–0.079 in) long with pale, thin edges. Flowering occurs in September and October and the fruit is a capsule 5–7 mm (0.20–0.28 in) in diameter.

== Taxonomy ==
This subspecies was first described in 1989 by Joy Thompson in the journal Telopea, from specimens collected near Dungog in 1975.

== Distribution and habitat ==
Leptospermum polygalifolium subsp. cismontanum is common in near-coastal forests between Fraser Island in Queensland and Gosford in New South Wales. It often grows on sandstone but is also found in coastal swamps, old dunes and hillsides.
