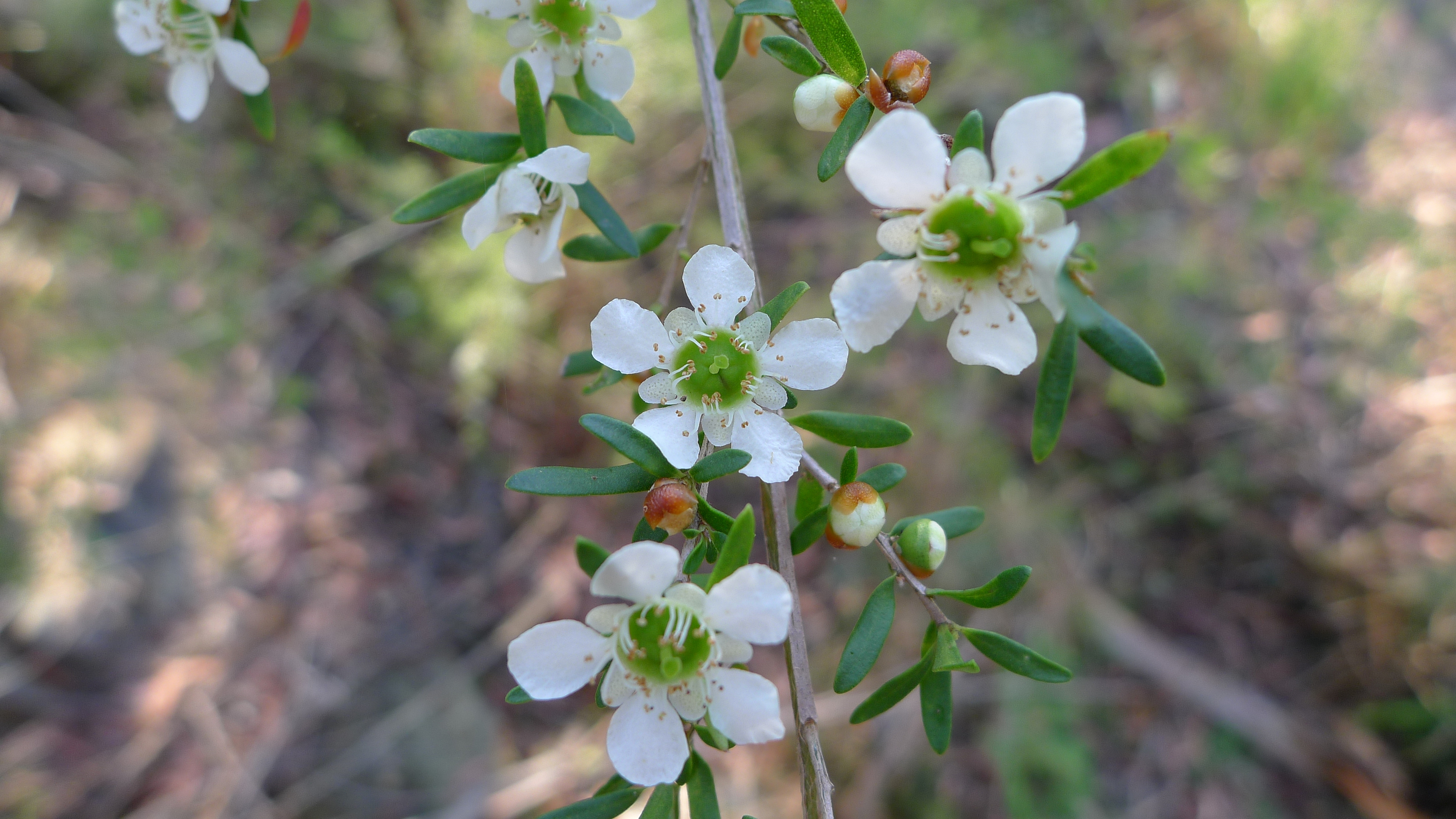

Scientific classification
- Kingdom: Plantae
- Clade: Tracheophytes
- Clade: Angiosperms
- Clade: Eudicots
- Clade: Rosids
- Order: Myrtales
- Family: Myrtaceae
- Genus: Leptospermum
- Species: L. polygalifolium

Binomial name
- Leptospermum polygalifolium Salisb.

Synonyms
- List: Leptospermum aquaticum Otto & A.Dietr. nom. inval., pro syn.; Leptospermum buxifolium H.L.Wendl.; Leptospermum flavescens f. microphyllum Siebert & Voss; Leptospermum nervosum Otto & A.Dietr. nom. inval., pro syn.; Leptospermum obtusum G.Don nom. inval., nom. nud.; Leptospermum polygalaefolium Salisb. orth. var.; Leptospermum retusum Otto & A.Dietr. nom. inval., pro syn.; Leptospermum roseum Otto & A.Dietr. nom. inval., pro syn.; Leptospermum stellatum Cav. p.p.; Leptospermum stellatum Cav. f. stellatum p.p.; Leptospermum stellatum Cav. var. stellatum p.p.; Leptospermum stellatum var. typicum Hochr. nom. inval. p.p.; Leptospermum thea (Schrad. & J.C.Wendl.) Willd.; Melaleuca thea Schrad. & J.C.Wendl.

= Leptospermum polygalifolium =

Tantoon

Species of shrub

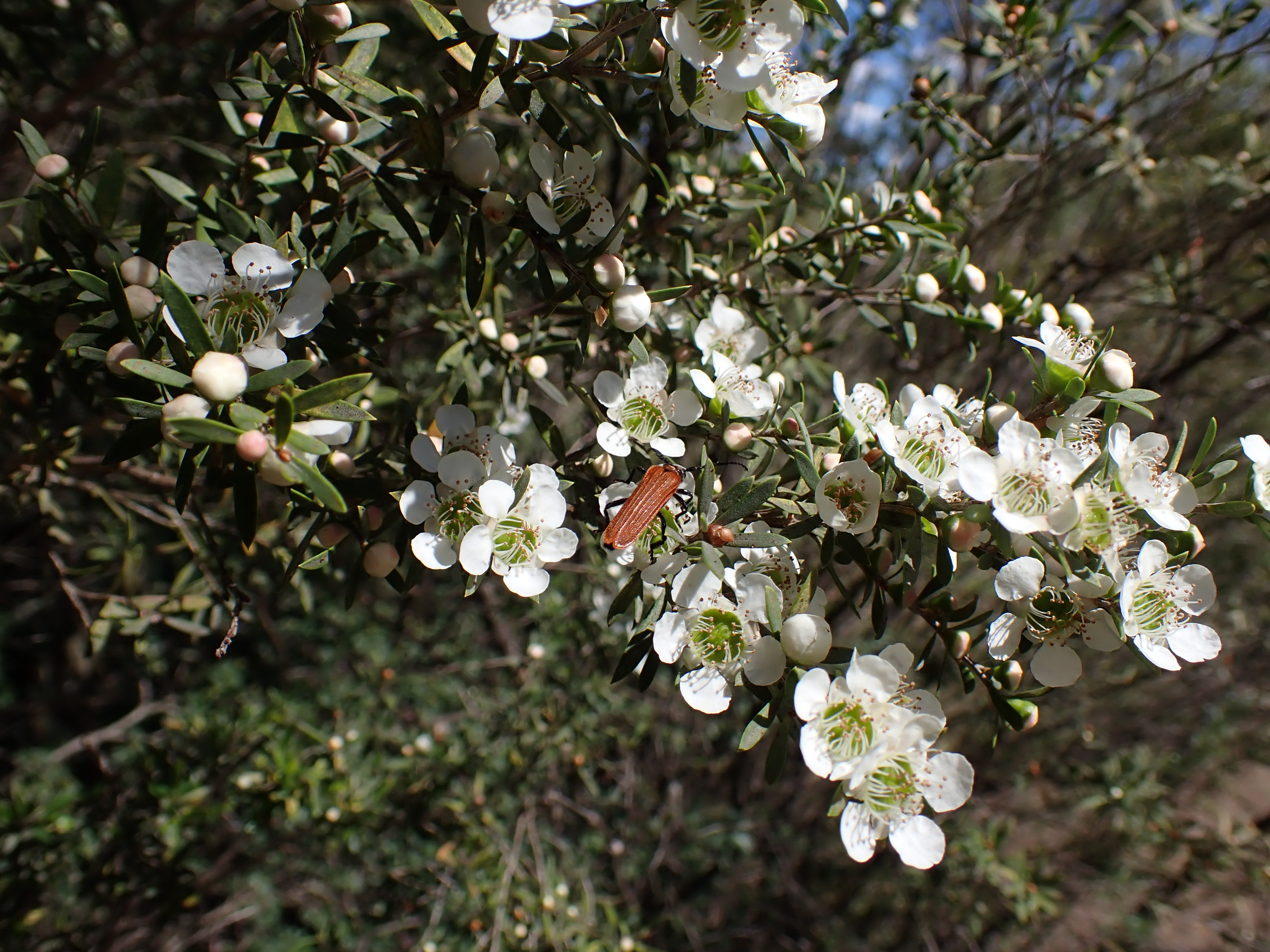
Subsp. transmontanum

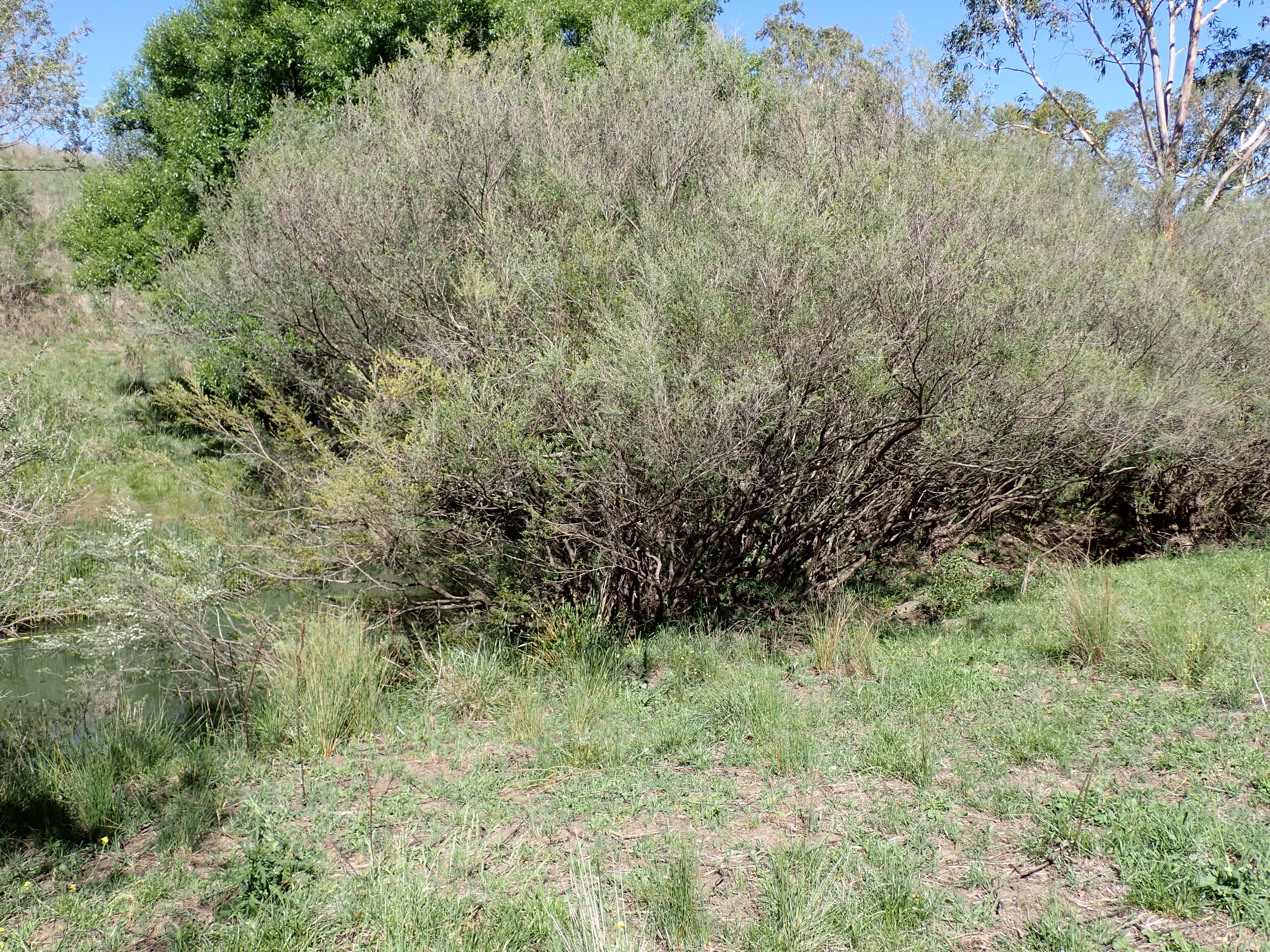
Subsp. transmontanum habit near Armidale

Leptospermum polygalifolium, commonly known as tantoon, jellybush or yellow tea tree, is a species of shrub or tree of the family Myrtaceae that is endemic to eastern Australia, including Lord Howe Island. It has thin bark, elliptical leaves, white flowers arranged singly on short side shoots and fruit that remain on the plant for a few years.

== Description ==
Leptospermum polygalifolium is a shrub that typically grows to a height of 0.5–3 m (1 ft 8 in – 9 ft 10 in) or a tree to 7 m (23 ft) or more, with thin bark but that is thick and flaky in larger specimens. Younger stems are covered with short hairs at first and have a conspicuous flange near the leaf bases. The flowers are white, greenish, cream-coloured or sometimes pink, mostly 10–15 mm (0.39–0.59 in) in diameter and are arranged singly on short side shoots. There are dark reddish-brown bracts and similar bracteoles at the base of the young flower buds but that are shed as the bud develops. The floral cup is usually glabrous, 2–4 mm (0.079–0.157 in) long, tapering to a pedicel about 1 mm (0.039 in) long. The sepals are broadly egg-shaped to oblong, 1.5–2.5 mm (0.059–0.098 in) long and are lost before the fruit develops. The petals are 4–6 mm (0.16–0.24 in) long and the stamens 2.5–4 mm (0.098–0.157 in) long. Flowering mainly occurs from August to January and the fruit is a capsule about 5–8 mm (0.20–0.31 in) in diameter that remains on the plant for a few years.

== Taxonomy and naming ==
Leptospermum polygalifolium was first described by Richard Salisbury in 1797 from a specimen collected in Port Jackson. The description was published in Salisbury's book, Prodromus Stirpium in Horto ad Chapel Allerton Vigentium. The specific epithet (polygalifolium) is a reference to the genus Polygala, with the ending -folium from the Latin -folius meaning "-leaved".

=== Subspecies ===
In 1989, Joy Thompson described six subspecies and the names are accepted by the Australian Plant Census:

- Leptospermum polygalifolium subsp. cismontanum Joy Thomps. has leaves 8–10 mm (0.31–0.39 in) x 2 mm (0.079 in) that tend to have edges turned under, white flowers about 10 mm (0.39 in) wide, fruit 5–7 mm (0.20–0.28 in) wide and occurs from Fraser Island to Gosford.
- Leptospermum polygalifolium subsp. howense Joy Thomps. has leaves 5–8 mm (0.20–0.31 in) long, white flowers about 15 mm (0.59 in) in diameter and fruit 5–8 mm (0.20–0.31 in) in diameter and is endemism to Lord Howe Island.
- Leptospermum polygalifolium subsp. montanum Joy Thomps. has leaves 10–15 mm (0.39–0.59 in) x 3–5 mm (0.12–0.20 in) that tend to have edges turned under, white flowers about 12 mm (0.47 in) wide, fruit 6–9 mm (0.24–0.35 in) wide and occurs in montane eastern Australia from Southeast Queensland to Barrington Tops.
- Leptospermum polygalifolium Salisb. subsp. polygalifolium has leaves 10–20 mm (0.39–0.79 in) x 2–3 mm (0.079–0.118 in) that tend to have edges turned under, greenish or creamy-white flowers about 12 mm (0.47 in) wide, fruit 6–10 mm (0.24–0.39 in) wide and occurs from central eastern New South Wales to the southern border with Victoria.
- Leptospermum polygalifolium subsp. transmontanum Joy Thomps. has leaves 10–15 mm (0.39–0.59 in) x 2 mm (0.079 in) that are flat and stiff, white flowers 10–12 mm (0.39–0.47 in) wide, fruit 6–7 mm (0.24–0.28 in) wide and occurs from the White Mountains in Queensland to the Hunter River in New South Wales.
- Leptospermum polygalifolium subsp. tropicum Joy Thomps. has leaves 5–20 mm (0.20–0.79 in) x 1–1.5 mm (0.039–0.059 in) and occurs from Cooktown to Keppel Bay in Queensland.
