= Leptospermum polygalifolium subsp. howense =

Scientific classification
- Kingdom: Plantae
- Clade: Tracheophytes
- Clade: Angiosperms
- Clade: Eudicots
- Clade: Rosids
- Order: Myrtales
- Family: Myrtaceae
- Genus: Leptospermum
- Species: L. polygalifolium
- Subspecies: L. p. subsp. howense

Trinomial name
- Leptospermum polygalifolium subsp. howense Joy Thomps.

Subspecies of flowering plant

Leptospermum polygalifolium subsp. howense, commonly known as tea tree or tea-tree, is a flowering plant in the myrtle family, Myrtaceae. The subspecific epithet refers to the island to which the subspecies is endemic.

== Description ==
It is a rough-barked shrub or small spreading tree, growing to about 5 m, occasionally to 10 m. The narrowly elliptic to narrowly oblanceolate leaves are 5–8 mm long and 2–2.5 mm wide. The conspicuous white flowers, 15 mm across, appear from November to January. The fruits are woody, 6 mm diameter, domed, 5-valved capsules.

== Distribution and habitat ==
The subspecies is endemic to Australia's subtropical Lord Howe Island in the Tasman Sea. It is a characteristic plant of the island's mountain peaks, sometimes occurring at lower elevations, in evergreen forest and shrubland.
