= Mount Hyland Nature Reserve =

Protected area in New South Wales, Australia

- IUCN category Ia (strict nature reserve)
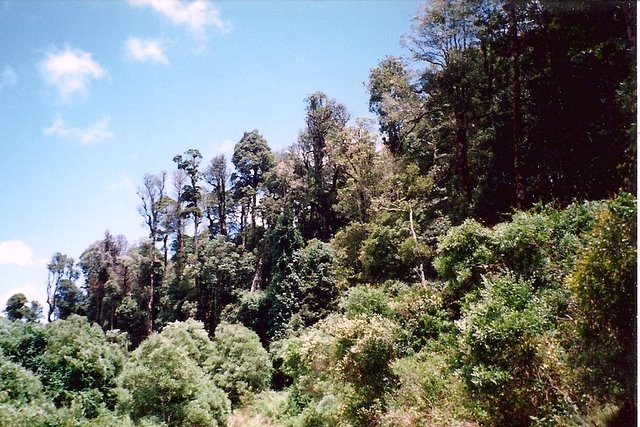
- Doryphora sassafras in the reserve.

- Location within New South Wales
- Location: New South Wales
- Nearest city: Dorrigo
- Coordinates: 30°09′36″S 152°26′42″E
- Area: 25.19 km^{2} (9.73 sq mi)
- Established: June 1984
- Governing body: NSW National Parks and Wildlife Service
- Website: Official website

The Mount Hyland Nature Reserve is a protected nature reserve in the New England region of New South Wales, in eastern Australia. The 2,519-hectare (6,220-acre) reserve is situated approximately 35 kilometres (22 mi) west of Dorrigo.

The reserve is part of the New England Group of the UNESCO World Heritage–listed Gondwana Rainforests of Australia, inscribed in 1986 and added to the Australian National Heritage List in 2007.

== Features ==
Mount Hyland is a triple peaked mountain, some 400 metres (1,300 ft) higher than the surrounding plain. The highest point is 1,434 metres (4,705 ft) above sea level.

The temperate rainforest is of scientific interest, being a remnant of former Gondwana forests that once covered Australia. The rainforest lacks the Antarctic beech and is dominated by common sassafras and other species.

This remote hotspot of biodiversity is home to many endangered animal species. Thus, in the early 1980s, the Hastings River mouse and rare pouched frog, which were believed to be extinct, were rediscovered.

=== Molluscs ===
Indigenous molluscs at the reserve include the following species: Triboniophorus graeffei, Terrycarlessia turbinata, Protorugosa alpica, Austrorhytida harrietae, Parmavitrina planilabris, Mysticarion porrectus, Brazieresta larreyi, Thersites novaehollandiae and Austrochloritis sp.

== See also ==
- Protected areas of New South Wales
- High Conservation Value Old Growth forest
