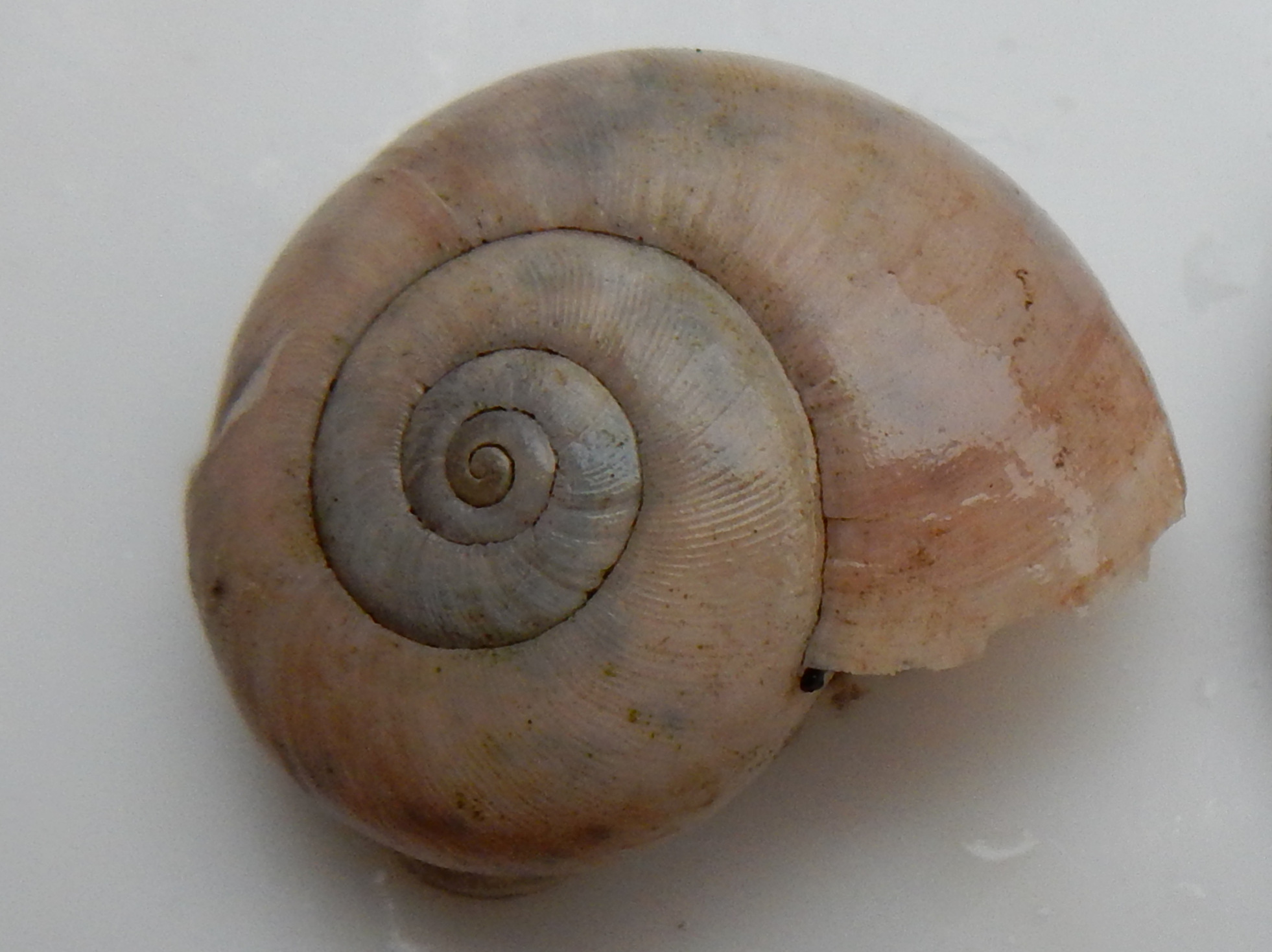
- Ferndale Park, Australia

Scientific classification
- Kingdom: Animalia
- Phylum: Mollusca
- Class: Gastropoda
- Order: Stylommatophora
- Family: Rhytididae
- Genus: Terrycarlessia
- Species: T. turbinata

Binomial name
- Terrycarlessia turbinata Stanisic, 2010

= Terrycarlessia turbinata =

Species of snail from Australia

Terrycarlessia turbinata, the glossy turban carnivorous snail, is a species of air-breathing land snail found in Australia. The natural range is from the Barrington Tops region in New South Wales to about Nambour in south-eastern Queensland. However, the snail has been recorded in Sydney as an invasive species.
