= Ebor, New South Wales =

Ebor
- Town
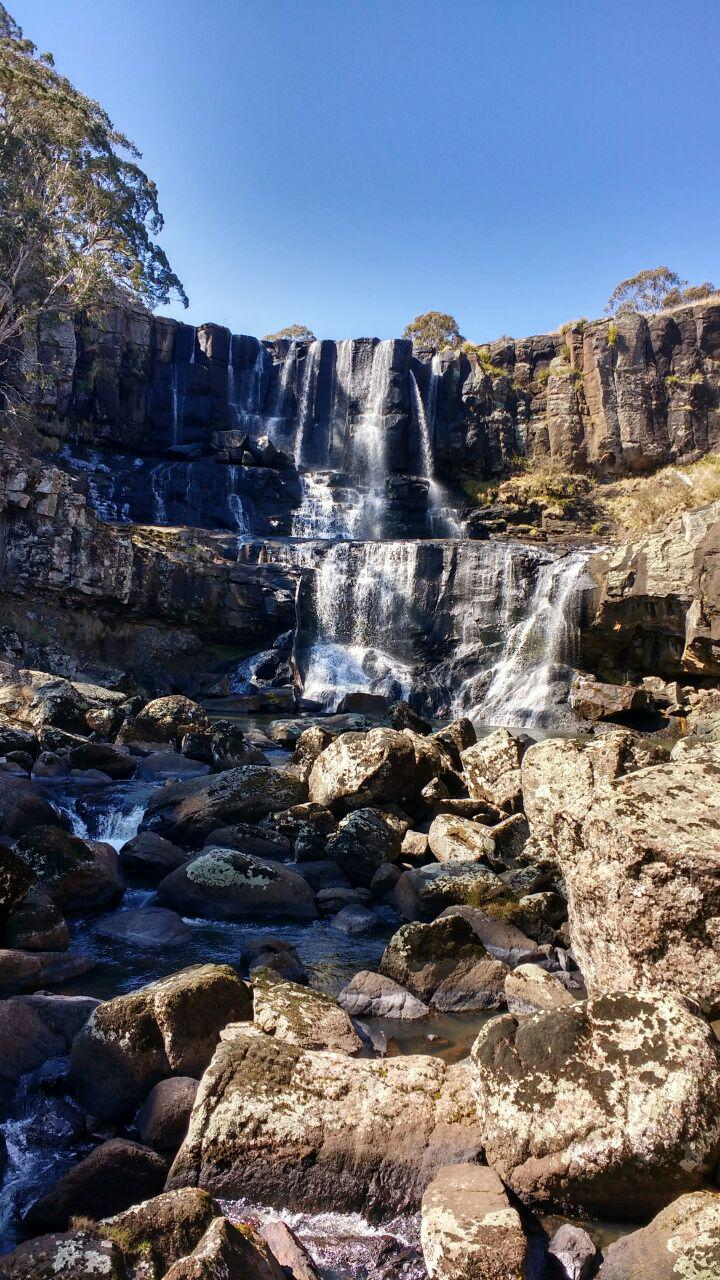
- Upper Falls, Ebor

- Coordinates: 30°24′S 152°21′E
- Country: Australia
- State: New South Wales
- LGA: Armidale Regional Council
- Location: 559 km (347 mi) N of Sydney; 120 km (75 mi) SE of Grafton; 74 km (46 mi) E of Armidale; 78 km (48 mi) E of Guyra; 46 km (29 mi) W of Dorrigo

Government
  - State electorate: Northern Tablelands
  - Federal division: New England
- Elevation: 1,350 m (4,430 ft)

Population
  - Total: 149 (2021 census)
- Postcode: 2453
- County: Clarke
- Mean max temp: 19.8 °C (67.6 °F)
- Mean min temp: 9.9 °C (49.8 °F)
- Annual rainfall: 950 mm (37 in)

Ebor is a village on Waterfall Way on the Northern Tablelands in New South Wales, Australia. It is situated about 80 km (50 mi) east of Armidale and about a third of the way between Armidale and the coast. Dorrigo to the east is 46 kilometres (29 mi) away with the Coffs Coast 55 kilometres (34 mi) away along Waterfall Way. In the 2021 census, Ebor's zone had a population of 149.

== History ==
Gumbaynggirr people, who traditionally lived in the area, referred to the nearby set of waterfalls, Ebor Falls, as Martiam (meaning 'the great falls'). Ebor village shares its name with the falls, which is a local tourist attraction.

The village's wooden Catholic church burned down in October 1946.

At the 2021 census, Ebor had a population of 149 people.

== Borderlands ==
Although "The Heart of Waterfall Way", Ebor is on the eastern edge of Armidale Regional Council, and close to the border of Clarence Valley Council and Bellingen Shire Council. Until the amalgamation of Guyra and Armidale councils, one side of Ebor was under Armidale council, and the other under Guyra shire. Likewise, Ebor is close to three state electoral districts (Northern Tablelands, Oxley and Clarence) and three federal electoral boundaries (New England, Cowper and Page).

The village's location on the boundary of the Hunter New England and the Mid North Coast Local Health Districts has created confusion for residents regarding access to health services.

== Facilities ==
Amenities in the area include a cafe, a combined post office, fuel station and general store, a pub/motel with camp ground, and a NSW DEC primary school. The local sports ground is home of the Ebor Campdraft.

There are also Rural Fire Service and National Parks and Wildlife Service depots in the area, but no police or ambulance services based in Ebor. The nearest hospital and 24h emergency department is in Dorrigo.

== Features ==
Due to its central position on Waterfall Way, Ebor offers easy access for residents and tourists to Guy Fawkes River National Park, Cathedral Rock National Park, Cunnawarra National Park, New England National Park, part of Oxley Wild Rivers National Park, Nymboi-Binderay National Park and Mount Hyland Nature Reserve.

The natural environment of the surrounding district includes several areas which have been cleared for pastoralism and forestry. Nonetheless, the national parks around Ebor have been described as a bush walking "Mecca". The main tourist attraction is the twin Ebor Falls.

In 1930 Sydney Smith Jr. wrote that: "During a recent visit to Ebor I was much impressed with the possibilities of this part of the State as a tourist resort... Around Ebor and Guy Fawkes can be seen some of the most magnificent scenery in this State if not Australia. ...The two falls are scenes of beauty, and in winter time are sometimes frozen, making a beautiful spectacle as they hang in huge icicles. The water from the Ebor eventually finds an outlet in the Clarence River. ...The view, ...as regards expansiveness, ruggedness, and beauty, must compare more than favourably with views of a similar nature in any part of the Commonwealth. It reminded me of the Valley of a Thousand Hills, outside Durban, in South Africa".

In 1976, local historian Eric Fahey also wrote: "I believe the future of Dorrigo will depend largely on tourism. The area has a lot to offer, both in peerless scenery and because of the native fauna which can be seen in large numbers in their natural state."

Wagyu beef specialists Stone Axe have a large holding, "Glen Alvie", on the northern boundary of the village. Stone Axe also acquired "Alfreda" in the nearby locality of Wongwibinda.

Black truffles (tuber melanosporum) are grown at the Guy Fawkes Truffle Company outside of Ebor on the Guyra Rd.

Trout are another local product. The Dutton Trout Hatchery on Point Lookout Road was established in 1950 and is one of the largest hatcheries in the state. Visitors can see the various stages of trout development prior to their release in the mountain streams. The release of trout into local streams is believed to have led to decline of the endangered Tusked frog.

There are two short walks close to the village. One takes walkers through the 40 hectares (99 acres) recreation reserve. This walk follows the Guy Fawkes River upstream for about half of the walk. Some bird life can be seen. The second walk is accessed by crossing the Guy Fawkes River bridge, and following the pedestrian path that winds downstream under the bridge. This path follows the Guy Fawkes River north and meets the national park's Upper and Lower Falls paths. Wallabies, kangaroos, bird life and fire-flies can be seen depending on the season. Platypus have also been sighted in August in the pool above the falls.

The Bicentennial National Trail (BNT) passes through Ebor, which sits on the boundary of sections 7 and 8 of the BNT.

The Ebor Falls area is sometimes used for rock climbing, and is described as "holding a rather special place in the History of New England climbing".

== Speeding and traffic ==
Ebor has a noted problem with speeding vehicles. Both passenger cars and heavy vehicles regularly exceed the posted speed limit of 50 km/h. Traffic noise is also a problem. Waterfall Way has an entry on the Dangerous Roads website.

== Post office ==
Ebor's Post Office opened on 2 March 1868, closed in 1869 and reopened in 1910. It is currently located at the Ebor petrol station/store having moved from Fusspots Cafe.

== Cultural heritage ==
Ebor has a number of cultural heritage sites, including several Aboriginal meeting places, and massacre sites.

"Gwenda Gardens" is an abandoned homestead on the Guyra-Ebor Road.

Other sites include:

- Waterfall Way: Yooroonah Tank Barrier
- Former Cottage Hospital at 5 Parke Street
- Ebor Cemetery off Waterfall Way
- Deconsecrated Union Church at 11608 Waterfall Way
- Former Ebor Soldiers Hall at 11626 Waterfall Way
- Former Australian Bank of Commerce (formerly City Bank of Sydney) at 27 Ebor Street
- Homestead, "Milamba" (including original Guy Fawkes Post Office and sheep dip) at 7122 Grafton Road
- House, "Kotupna" at 7314 Grafton Road
- Cement weir at 337 Point Lookout Road

== Climate ==
The village of Ebor is at high altitude 1,300 metres (4,300 ft) by Australian standards. It has cold winters with frequent overnight frost and occasional light snow falls. The average rain fall is about 1,300 millimetres (51 in).
