= Cathedral Rock National Park =

National park in New South Wales, Australia

- IUCN category II (national park)
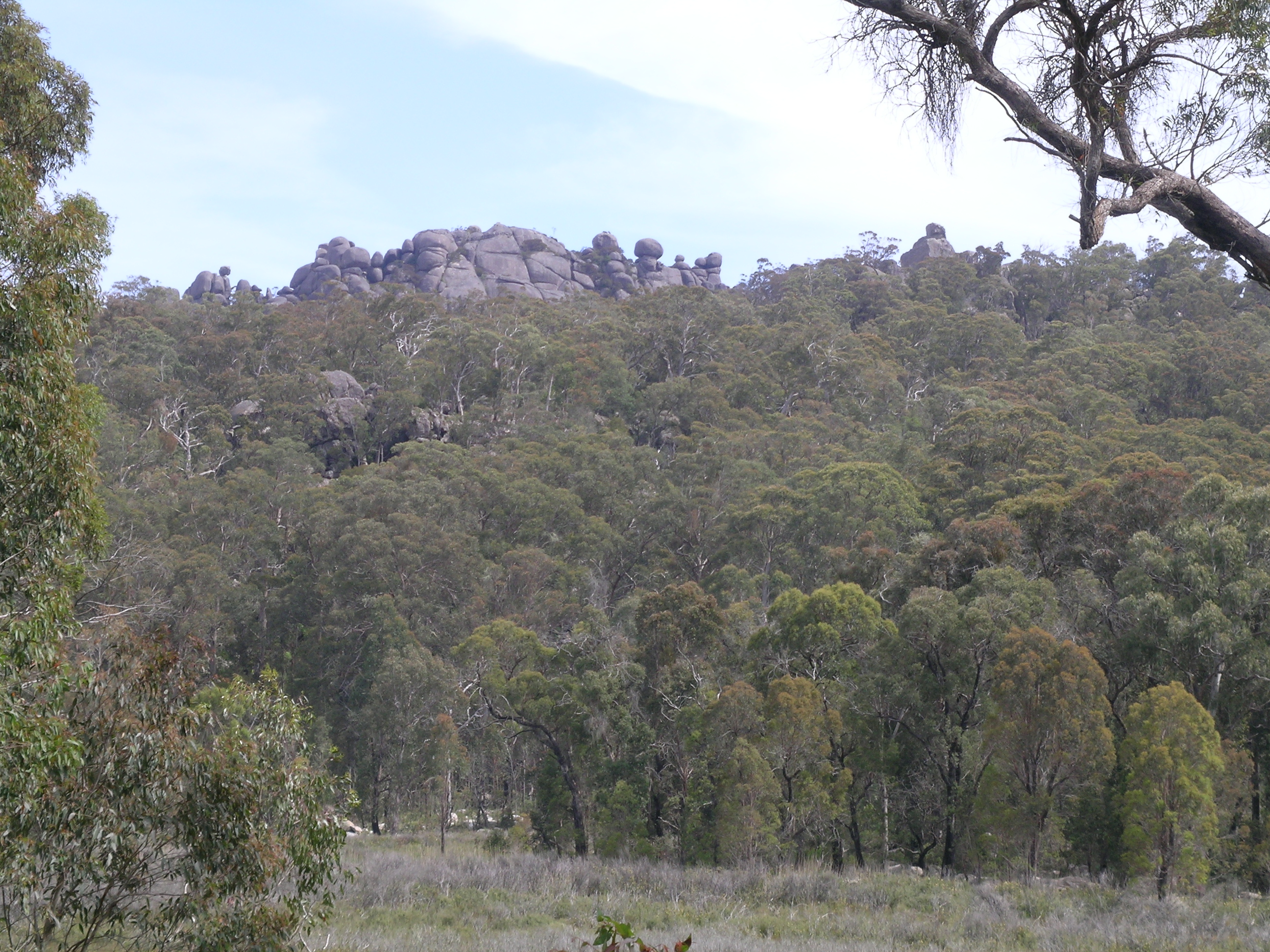
- Granite tors in Cathedral Rock National Park

- Location within New South Wales
- Location: New South Wales
- Coordinates: 30°25′51″S 152°16′01″E
- Area: 89 km^{2} (34 sq mi)
- Established: 1978
- Governing body: NSW National Parks & Wildlife Service
- Website: https://www.nationalparks.nsw.gov.au/visit-a-park/parks/cathedral-rock-national-park

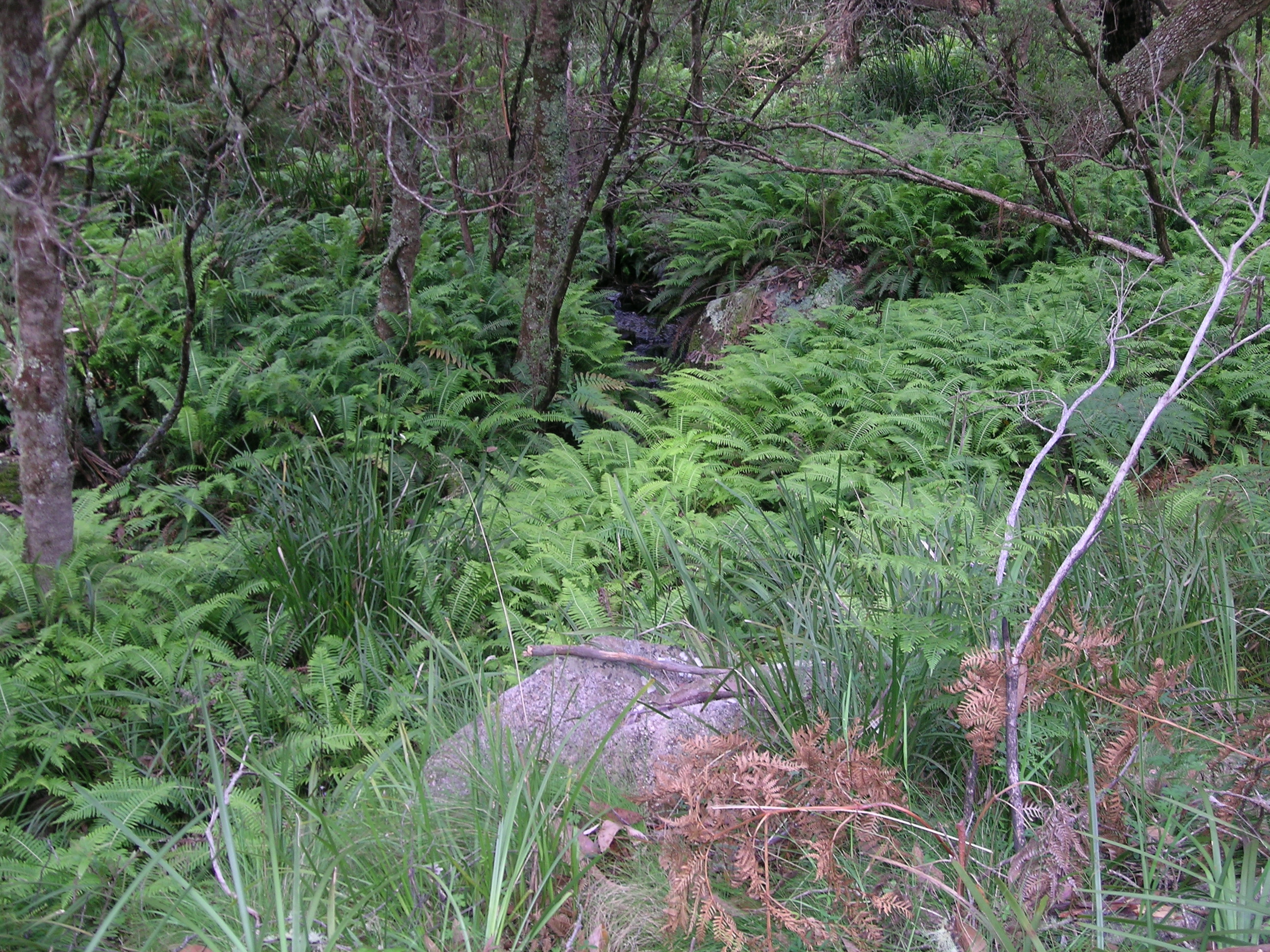
Gleichenia dicarpa (pouched coral fern) in a shaded gully on the Cathedral Rock Track

Cathedral Rock is a national park 8 kilometres (5.0 mi) west of Waterfall Way in New South Wales, Australia, 70 kilometres (43 mi) east of Armidale and about 555 kilometres (345 mi) north of Sydney.

This park is lying between the Guy Fawkes River and Macleay Range, and is about six kilometres west of Ebor, New South Wales.

The highest peak of the New England Tableland, Round Mountain, is located in the park.

This is a great place for hiking, camping, picnicking and bird watching. Black cockatoos, a rare turquoise parrot and a wedge-tailed eagle can be found circling the surrounding cliffs in search of prey.

== See also ==
- Protected areas of New South Wales
