= List of threatened flora of Australia =

The Australian Government's Species Profile and Threats Database (SPRAT) includes all plant species listed as critically endangered or endangered in Australia under the Environment Protection and Biodiversity Conservation Act 1999 (EPBC Act).

== Critically endangered ==
Species	Common name	Location(s)
Abutilon julianae	Norfolk Island abutilon	Norfolk Island
Acacia atrox	Myall Creek Wattle	
Acacia blayana	Blay's Wattle	
jp:Acacia cochlocarpa subsp. velutinosa	Velvety spiral pod wattle	WA
Acacia constablei	Narrabarba Wattle	
Acacia dangarensis		
Acacia equisetifolia	Graveside Gorge acacia	NT
Acacia forsteri	Forster's Wattle	QLD
Acacia leptoneura		WA
Acacia lumholtzii	Girringun Wattle	
Acacia prismifolia	Diel's Wattle	
Acacia purpureopetala	Purple-flowered Wattle	QLD
Acacia unguicula		VIC
Acanthocladium dockeri	Spiny everlasting	SA
Achyranthes arborescens	Chaff tree, soft-wood	Norfolk Island
Achyranthes margaretarum	Phillip Island Chaffy tree	Norfolk Island (Phillip Island)
Andersonia annelsii		
Andersonia axilliflora	Giant Andersonia	
Androcalva adenothalia		
Androcalva beeronensis		
Androcalva bivillosa	Straggling Androcalva	
Androcalva inglewoodensis		
Androcalva perkinsiana		
Caladenia actensis syn. Arachnorchis actensis	Canberra spider-orchid	ACT
Argentipallium spiceri	Spicer's everlasting	TAS
Arthrochilus huntianus subsp. nothofagicola	Myrtle elbow orchid	TAS
Asplenium listeri	Christmas Island spleenwort	Christmas Island
Atalaya brevialata	Elizabeth River whitewood	NT
Azorella macquariensis	Macquarie cushions	Macquarie Island
Banksia anatona	Cactus dryandra	WA
Banksia aurantia	Orange dryandra	WA
Banksia fuscobractea	Dark-bract banksia	WA
Barbarea australis	Native wintercress	TAS
Boehmeria australis var. australis	Tree nettle, nettletree	Norfolk Island
Brachychiton sp. Ormeau	Ormeau bottle tree	QLD
Brachyscias verecundus	Ironstone brachyscias	WA
Caladenia anthracina	Black-tipped spider-orchid	TAS
Caladenia campbellii	Thick-stem spider-orchid	TAS
Caladenia dienema	Windswept spider-orchid	TAS
Caladenia lindleyana	Lindley's spider-orchid	TAS
Caladenia pallida	Rosy spider-orchid, pale spider-orchid, summer spider-orchid	TAS
Caladenia saggicola	Sagg spider-orchid	TAS
Caladenia sp. aff. venusta	Kilsyth South spider-orchid	VIC
Caladenia sylvicola	Forest fingers	TAS
Caladenia tonellii	Robust fingers	TAS
Callistemon megalongensis	Megalong Valley bottlebrush	NSW
Calystegia affinis	Creeping vine	Lord Howe Island, Norfolk Island
Clematis dubia	Mount Pitt clematis	Norfolk Island
Conostylis setigera subsp. dasys	Boscabel conostylis	WA
Corunastylis ectopa	Brindabella midge-orchid, ectopic midge-orchid	ACT
Corunastylis insignis	Variable midge-orchid	NSW
Corunastylis littoralis syn. Genoplesium littorale	Tuncurry midge-orchid	NSW
Corybas sulcatus syn. Nematoceras sulcatum	Grooved helmet-orchid	Macquarie Island
Darwinia foetida	Muchea bell	WA
Dasymalla axillaris	Native foxglove	WA
Daviesia glossosema	Maroon daviesia	WA
Diuris flavescens	Wingham doubletail	NSW
Duma horrida subsp. abdita	Remote thorny lignum	WA
Eidothea hardeniana	Nightcap oak	NSW
Elatostema montanum	Mountain procris	Norfolk Island
Elymus multiflorus var. kingianus	Phillip Island wheat-grass	Norfolk Island, Lord Howe Island
Epacris barbata	Bearded heath, Freycinet heath	TAS
Epacris graniticola	Mount Cameron heath	TAS
Epacris limbata	Border heath	TAS
Epacris stuartii	Stuart's heath	TAS
Eremophila koobabbiensis	Koobabbie poverty bush	WA
Eucalyptus recurva	Mongarlowe mallee	NSW
Euphorbia norfolkiana	Norfolk Island euphorbia	Norfolk Island
Euphrasia arguta	Nundle eyebright, pungent eyebright	NSW
Euphrasia fragosa	Shy eyebright, Southport eyebright	TAS
Euphrasia gibbsiae subsp. psilantherea	Swamp eyebright	TAS
Galium antarcticum	Antarctic bedstraw	Macquarie Island
Gastrolobium diabolophyllum	Bodallin poison	WA
Gastrolobium leuteifolium	Yellow-leafed poison	WA
Genoplesium firthii	Firth's midge-orchid	TAS
Grevillea brachystylis subsp. grandis	Large-flowered short-styled grevillea	WA
Guichenotia seorsiflora		WA
Gyrostemon reticulatus	Net-veined gyrostemon	WA
Haloragis platycarpa	Broad-fruited haloragis	WA
Hemigenia ramosissima	Branched hemigenia	WA
Hibiscus insularis	Phillip Island hibiscus	Norfolk Island
Hibbertia priceana	Price's guinea-flower	WA
Hibbertia puberula subsp. glabrescens	Bankstown guinea-flower	NSW
Hibbertia tenuis		SA
Hybanthus cymulosus	Ninghan violet	WA
Hydatella leptogyne	Few-flowered hydatella	WA
Isopogon robustus	Robust cone-flower	WA
Keraudrenia exastia	Fringed keraudrania	WA
Lepidorrhachis mooreana	Little Mountain palm	Lord Howe Island
Leucopogon spectabilis	Ironstone beard-heath	WA
Lomatia tasmanica	King's lomatia	TAS
Lysiosepalum abollatum	Woolly lysiosepalum	WA
Macadamia jansenii	Bulberin nut	QLD
Melicytus latifolius	Norfolk Island mahoe	Norfolk Island
Meryta latifolia	Shade tree, broad-leaved meryta	Norfolk Island
Muehlenbeckia horrida subsp. abdita	Remote thorny lignum	WA
Myoporum obscurum	Popwood, sandalwood, bastard ironwood	Norfolk Island
Notelaea ipsviciensis	Cooneana olive	QLD
Paragoodia crenulata		WA
Persoonia pauciflora	North Rothbury geebung	NSW
Phebalium daviesii	Davies' waxflower, St Helens waxflower	TAS
Phebalium distans	Mount Berryman waxflower	QLD
Philotheca freyciana	Freycinet waxflower	TAS
Phlegmariurus squarrosus	Rock tassel-fern	QLD
Phreatia limenophylax	Norfolk Island phreatia	Norfolk Island
Pimelea spinescens subsp. pubiflora	Wimmera rice-flower	VIC
Pimelea spinescens subsp. spinescens	Plains rice-flower, spiny rice-flower, prickly pimelea	VIC
Pneumatopteris truncata	Christmas Island fern	Christmas Island
Prasophyllum atratum	Three Hummock leek-orchid	TAS (Three Hummock Island)
Prasophyllum bagoense	Bago leek-orchid	NSW
Prasophyllum castaneum	Chestnut leek-orchid	TAS
Prasophyllum favonium	Western leek-orchid	TAS
Prasophyllum incorrectum	Golfers leek-orchid	TAS
Prasophyllum innubum	Brandy Marys leek-orchid	NSW
Prasophyllum keltonii	Keltons leek-orchid	NSW
Prasophyllum laxum	Lax leek-orchid	SA
Prasophyllum limnetes	Marsh leek-orchid	TAS
Prasophyllum milfordense	Milford leek-orchid	TAS
Prasophyllum murfetii	Fleurieu leek-orchid	SA
Prasophyllum olidum	Pungent leek-orchid	TAS
Prasophyllum perangustum	Knocklofty leek-orchid	TAS
Prasophyllum pulchellum	Pretty leek-orchid	TAS
Prasophyllum robustum	Robust leek-orchid	TAS North Coast
Prasophyllum stellatum	Ben Lomond leek-orchid	TAS
Prasophyllum taphanyx	Graveside leek-orchid	TAS
Prostanthera albohirta		QLD
Prostanthera clotteniana		QLD
Prostanthera marifolia	Seaforth mintbush	NSW
Prostanthera staurophylla	Seaforth mintbush	NSW
Pterostylis bryophila	Hindmarsh Valley greenhood	SA
Pterostylis commutata	Midland greenhood	TAS
Pterostylis oreophila	Kiandra greenhood	NSW
Pterostylis valida	Robust greenhood	VIC
Pterostylis vernalis	Halbury rustyhood	NSW
Pterostylis wapstrarum	Fleshy greenhood	TAS
Ptilotus pyramidatus	Pyramid mulla-mulla	WA
Pultenaea sp. Genowlan Point	Genowlan Point pultenaea	NSW Central Tablelands
Reedia spathacea	Reedia	WA
Sagina diemensis	Pearlwort	TAS
Scaevola macrophylla	Cape Riche fan-flower, large-flowered scaevola	WA
Synaphea selenae	Selena's synaphea	WA
Synaphea sp. Pinjarra	Club-leafed synaphea	WA
Tetratheca nephelioides		WA
Thelymitra adorata	Wyong sun-orchid	NSW
Thelymitra cyanapicata	Blue top sun-orchid	SA
Thelymitra jonesii	Sky-blue sun-orchid	TAS
Thelymitra kangaloonica	Kangaloon sun-orchid	NSW
Veronica derwentiana subsp. homalodonta	Mount Lofty speedwell	SA
Verticordia apecta	Hay River featherflower	WA
Wikstroemia australis	Norfolk Island kurrajong	Norfolk Island
Zieria exsul	Banished stink bush	QLD
Zieria vagans	Gurgeena stink bush	QLD

== Endangered ==
Species	Common name	Location(s)
Acacia aprica	Blunt wattle	WA
Acacia aristulata	Watheroo wattle	WA
Acacia ataxiphylla subsp. magna	Large-fruited Tammin wattle	WA
Acacia auratiflora	Orange-flowered wattle	WA
Acacia brachypoda	Western Wheatbelt wattle	WA
Acacia cochlocarpa subsp. cochlocarpa	Spiral-fruited wattle	WA
Acacia cretacea	Chalky wattle	SA
Acacia enterocarpa	Jumping-jack wattle	SA, VIC
Acacia gordonii	Gordon's wattle	NSW
Acacia imitans	Gibson wattle	WA
Acacia insolita subsp. recurva	Yornaning wattle	WA
Acacia lanuginophylla	Woolly wattle	WA
Acacia leptalea	Chinocup wattle	WA
Acacia lobulata	Chiddarcooping wattle	WA
Acacia pharangites	Wongan gully wattle	WA
Acacia pinguifolia	Fat-leaved wattle	SA
Acacia porcata	Toondahra wattle	QLD
Acacia pygmaea	Dwarf rock wattle	WA
Acacia recurvata	Recurved wattle	WA
Acacia rhamphophylla	Kundip wattle	WA
Acacia ruppii	Rupp's wattle	NSW
Acacia sciophanes	Wundowlin wattle, ghost wattle	WA
Acacia sp. Dandaragan (S. van Leeuwen 269)	Dandaragan wattle	WA
Acacia subflexuosa subsp. capillata	Hairy-stemmed zig-zag wattle	WA
Acacia terminalis subsp. terminalis	Sunshine wattle	NSW
Acacia vassalii	Vassal's wattle	WA
Acacia volubilis	Tangled wattle, tangle wattle	WA
Acacia whibleyana	Whibley wattle	SA
Acronychia littoralis	Scented acronychia	NSW, QLD
Adenanthos dobagii	Fitzgerald woollybush	WA
Adenanthos eyrei	Toolinna woollybush	WA
Adenanthos pungens subsp. effusus	Sprawling spiky woollybush	WA
Adenanthos velutinus	Velvet woollybush	WA
Agrostis adamsonii	Adamson's blown-grass	VIC
Alectryon ramiflorus	Isis tamarind	QLD
Allocasuarina defungens	Dwarf heath sheoak	NSW
Allocasuarina emuina	Emu Mountain sheoak	QLD
Allocasuarina glareicola		NSW
Allocasuarina portuensis	Nielsen Park sheoak	NSW
Allocasuarina robusta	Mount Compass oak-bush	SA
Allocasuarina thalassoscopica	Mount Coolum sheoak	QLD
Amyema plicatula		NSW
Andersonia axilliflora	Giant andersonia	WA
Andersonia gracilis	Slender andersonia	WA
Androcalva rosea	Sandy Hollow commersonia	NSW
Anigozanthos bicolor subsp. minor	Small two-colour kangaroo paw	WA
Aponogeton bullosus		QLD
Aponogeton proliferus	Aquatic herb	QLD
Archontophoenix myolensis	Myola archontophoenix	QLD
Aristida granitica		QLD
Asterolasia elegans		NSW
Astrotricha roddii		NSW, QLD
Atalaya collina	Yarwun whitewood	QLD
Austromyrtus fragrantissima	Scale myrtle, sweet myrtle	NSW, QLD
Austromyrtus gonoclada	Angle-stemmed myrtle	QLD
Baeckea kandos	Kandos baeckea	NSW
Ballantinia antipoda	Southern shepherd's purse	VIC
Banksia brownii	Brown's banksia, feather-leaved banksia	WA
Banksia cuneata	Matchstick banksia, Quairading banksia	WA
Banksia ionthocarpa	Kamballup dryandra, Kamballup banksia	WA
Banksia oligantha	Wagin banksia	WA
Banksia pseudoplumosa	False-plumed banksia	WA
Barbarea australis	Riverbed wintercress	TAS
Bertya ingramii	Narrow-leaved bertya	NSW
Bertya tasmanica subsp. tasmanica	Tasmanian bertya	TAS
Beyeria lepidopetala	Short-petalled beyeria, small-petalled beyeria	WA
Billardiera mollis	Hairy-fruited billardiera	WA
Blechnum norfolkianum	Norfolk Island water-fern	Norfolk Island
Boronia capitata subsp. capitata	Tutanning boronia	WA
Boronia exilis	Scott River boronia	WA
Boronia granitica	Granite boronia	NSW, QLD
Boronia repanda	Repand boronia, border boronia	NSW, QLD
Boronia revoluta	Ironcap boronia	WA
Borya mirabilis	Grampians pincushion-lily	VIC
Brachyscome muelleri	Corunna daisy	SA
Brachysema papilio	Butterfly-leaved brachysema	WA
Burmannia sp. Melville Island (R. Fensham 1021)	Melville Island burmannia	NT
Cajanus mareebensis		QLD
Caladenia amoena	Charming spider-orchid	VIC
Caladenia arenaria	Sand-hill spider-orchid	NSW
Caladenia argocalla	White-beauty spider-orchid	SA
Caladenia atroclavia	Black-clubbed spider-orchid	QLD
Caladenia audasii	McIvor spider-orchid, Audas spider-orchid	VIC
Caladenia barbarella	Small dragon-orchid	WA
Caladenia behrii	Pink-lipped spider-orchid	SA
Caladenia bryceana subsp. bryceana	Dwarf spider-orchid	WA
Caladenia busselliana Hopper & A. P. Brown ms.	Bussell's spider-orchid	WA
Caladenia caesarea subsp. maritima	Cape spider-orchid	WA
Caladenia carnea var. subulata	Striped pink fingers, striped spider-orchid	VIC
Caladenia colorata	Small western spider-orchid, coloured spider-orchid	SA, VIC
Caladenia conferta	Coast spider-orchid	SA
Caladenia dienema	Windswept spider-orchid	TAS
Caladenia dorrienii	Cossack spider-orchid	WA
Caladenia elegans Hopper & A. P. Brown ms.	Elegant spider-orchid	WA
Caladenia excelsa Hopper & A. P. Brown ms.	Giant spider-orchid	WA
Caladenia fragrantissima subsp. orientalis	Cream spider-orchid	VIC
Caladenia fulva	Tawny spider-orchid	VIC
Caladenia gladiolata	Bayonet spider-orchid, clubbed spider-orchid	SA
Caladenia hastata	Melblom's spider-orchid	VIC
Caladenia hoffmanii Hopper & A. P. Brown ms.	Hoffman's spider-orchid	WA
Caladenia huegelii Hopper & A. P. Brown ms.	Grand spider-orchid, king spider-orchid	WA
Caladenia lowanensis	Wimmera spider-orchid	VIC
Caladenia macroclavia	Large-club spider-orchid	SA
Caladenia orientalis	Eastern spider orchid	VIC
Caladenia richardsiorum	Little dip spider-orchid	SA
Caladenia rigida	Stiff white spider-orchid	SA
Caladenia robinsonii	Frankston spider-orchid	VIC
Caladenia rosella	Rosella spider-orchid, little pink spider-orchid	VIC
Caladenia tensa	Greencomb spider-orchid, rigid spider-orchid	NSW, SA, VIC
Caladenia thysanochila	Fringed spider-orchid	VIC
Caladenia viridescens Hopper & A. P. Brown ms.	Dunsborough spider-orchid	WA
Caladenia williamsiae	Williams spider-orchid	WA
Caladenia winfieldii Hopper & A. P. Brown ms.	Majestic spider-orchid	WA
Caladenia xanthochila	Yellow-lip spider-orchid	NSW, SA, VIC
Caladenia xantholeuca	White rabbits, Flinders Ranges white spider-orchid	SA
Callitris oblonga subsp. oblonga	South Esk pine	TAS
Calochilus psednus	Cardwell beard orchid	QLD
Calochilus richiae	Bald-tip beard-orchid	VIC
Calotis moorei	Moore's burr-daisy	NSW
Calytrix breviseta subsp. breviseta	Swamp starflower	WA
Carronia pedicellata		QLD
Chamelaucium sp. Gingin (N. G. Marchant s.n. 4/11/1988)	Gingin wax	WA
Chingia australis		QLD
Chordifex abortivus	Manypeaks rush	WA
Chorizema humile	Prostrate flame pea	WA
Chorizema varium	Limestone pea	WA
Conospermum densiflorum subsp. unicephalatum	One-headed smokebush	WA
Conospermum toddii	Victoria desert smokebush	WA
Conostylis dielsii subsp. teres	Irwin conostylis	WA
Conostylis drummondii	Drummond's conostylis	WA
Conostylis lepidospermoides	Sedge conostylis	WA
Conostylis micrantha	Small-flowered conostylis	WA
Conostylis misera	Grass conostylis	WA
Conostylis seorsiflora subsp. trichophylla	Hairy mat conostylis	WA
Conostylis setigera subsp. dasys	Boscabel conostylis	WA
Conostylis wonganensis	Wongan conostylis	WA
Coopernookia georgei	Mauve coopernookia	WA
Coprosma baueri	Coastal coprosma	Norfolk Island
Coprosma pilosa	Mountain coprosma	Norfolk Island
Corchorus cunninghamii	Native jute	NSW, QLD
Correa lawrenceana var. genoensis	Mountain correa	NSW, VIC
Corybas sp. Finniss (R. Bates 28794)	Finniss helmet-orchid	SA
Cossinia australiana	Cossinia	QLD
Craspedia preminghana	Preminghana billybutton	TAS
Crepidium lawleri		QLD
Crepidomanes endlicherianum	Middle filmy fern	Norfolk Island
Cyathea exilis	Mann Creek tree-fern	QLD
Cycas megacarpa		QLD
Cycas ophiolitica		QLD
Cynanchum elegans	White-flowered wax plant	NSW
Cyperus cephalotes		QLD
Cyphanthera odgersii subsp. occidentalis	Western woolly cyphanthera, western cyphanthera	WA
Danthonia popinensis	Blue wallaby grass	TAS
Daphnandra johnsonii	Illawarra socketwood	NSW
Darwinia acerosa	Fine-leaved bell, fine-leaved darwinia	WA
Darwinia apiculata	Scarp bell, scarp darwinia	WA
Darwinia carnea	Mogumber bell	WA
Darwinia chapmaniana Marchant & Keighery ms.		WA
Darwinia collina	Yellow mountain bell	WA
Darwinia ferricola N. G. Marchant & Keighery ms.	Scott River bell	WA
Darwinia oxylepis	Gillham's bell	WA
Darwinia sp. Carnamah (J. Coleby-Williams 148)	Harlequin bell	WA
Darwinia sp. Williamson (G. J. Keighery 12717)	Abba bell	WA
Darwinia wittwerorum	Wittwer's mountain bell	WA
Davidsonia jerseyana	Davidson's plum	NSW
Davidsonia sp. Mullumbimby-Currumbin Ck (A. G. Floyd 1595)	Smooth Davidson's plum	NSW, QLD
Daviesia bursarioides	Three Springs daviesia	WA
Daviesia cunderdin	Cunderdin daviesia	WA
Daviesia euphorbioides	Wongan cactus, Wongan daviesia	WA
Daviesia megacalyx	Long-sepalled naviesia	WA
Daviesia microcarpa	Norseman pea, Norseman daviesia	WA
Daviesia pseudaphylla	Stirling Range daviesia	WA
Daviesia speciosa	Beautiful daviesia	WA
Decaspermum sp. Mt Morgan (D. Hoy 71)	Mount Morgan silky myrtle	QLD
Dendrobium antennatum	Green antelope orchid	QLD
Dendrobium brachypus	Norfolk Island antler-orchid	Norfolk Island
Dendrobium lithocola		QLD
Dendrobium mirbelianum	Dark-stemmed antler-orchid	QLD
Dendrobium nindii	Blue antler-orchid	QLD
Deyeuxia appressa		NSW
Deyeuxia drummondii	Drummond's grass, Drummond grass	WA
Dianella amoena	Matted flax-lily	VIC
Digitaria porrecta	Finger panic grass	NSW, QLD
Diospyros mabacea	Red-fruited ebony, silky persimmon, ebony	NSW
Diplazium pallidum		QLD
Diploglottis campbellii	Small-leaved tamarind	NSW, QLD
Dipodium pictum	Brittle climbing-orchid	QLD
Diuris basaltica D. L. Jones ined.	Small golden moths orchid	VIC
Diuris fragrantissima	Sunshine diuris, fragrant doubletail, white diuris	VIC
Diuris lanceolata	Snake orchid	TAS
Diuris pedunculata	Small snake orchid, two-leaved golden moths, golden moths, cowslip orchid, snake orchid	ACT, NSW, QLD
Diuris purdiei	Purdie's donkey-orchid	WA
Dodonaea subglandulifera	Peep Hill hop-bush	SA
Drakaea confluens Hopper & A. P. Brown ms.	Late hammer-orchid	WA
Drakaea elastica	Glossy-leaved hammer-orchid, praying virgin	WA
Drakaea isolata Hopper & A. P. Brown ms.	Lonely hammer-orchid	WA
Drakonorchis drakeoides Hopper & A. P. Brown ms.	Hinged dragon orchid	WA
Drummondita ericoides	Moresby Range drummondita	WA
Dryandra anatona	Cactus dryandra, cactus honeypot	WA
Dryandra aurantia	Orange dryandra, orange honeypot	WA
Dryandra mimica	Summer honeypot	WA
Dryandra montana	Stirling Range dryandra	WA
Dryandra nivea subsp. uliginosa	Swamp honeypot	WA
Elaeocarpus sp. Rocky Creek (G. Read AQ 562114) also known as Elaeocarpus sedentarius	Minyon quandong	NSW
Elaeocarpus williamsianus	Hairy quandong	NSW
Endiandra cooperana	Cape Tribulation walnut	QLD
Endiandra floydii	Floyd's walnut	NSW, QLD
Epacris apsleyensis	Apsley heath	TAS
Epacris exserta	South Esk heath	TAS
Epacris glabella	Funnel heath	TAS
Epacris grandis	Grand heath	TAS
Epacris hamiltonii	Hamilton's heath	NSW
Epacris sp. aff. virgata graniticola	Mt Cameron heath	TAS
Epacris virgata sensu stricto Beaconsfield	Pretty heath, Dan Hill heath	TAS
Epiblema grandiflorum var. cyanea K. Dixon ms.	Blue babe-in-the-cradle orchid	WA
Eremochloa muricata	Warty emu bush	QLD
Eremophila denticulata subsp. trisulcata Chinnock ms.	Cumquat emu bush	WA
Eremophila lactea	Milky emu bush	WA
Eremophila nivea	Silky eremophila	WA
Eremophila pinnatifida Chinnock ms.	Pinnate-leaf eremophila	WA
Eremophila resinosa	Resinous eremophila, resin emu bush	WA
Eremophila scaberula	Rough emu bush	WA
Eremophila subteretifolia Chinnock ms.	Lake King emu bush	WA
Eremophila ternifolia	Wongan emu bush	WA
Eremophila veneta Chinnock ms.	Metal-flowered emu bush	WA
Eremophila verticillata	Whorled emu bush	WA
Eremophila virens	Campion eremophila, green-flowered emu bush	WA
Eremophila viscida	Varnish bush	WA
Eriocaulon australasicum	Southern pipewort	SA, VIC
Eriocaulon carsonii	Salt pipewort, button grass	NSW, QLD, SA
Eryngium fontanum	Blue devil	QLD
Eucalyptus absita	Badgingarra box	WA
Eucalyptus alligatrix subsp. limaensis	Lima stringybark	VIC
Eucalyptus balanites	Cadda Road mallee, Cadda mallee	WA
Eucalyptus beardiana	Beard's mallee	WA
Eucalyptus brevipes	Mukinbudin mallee	WA
Eucalyptus burdettiana	Burdett gum	WA
Eucalyptus canabolensis	Silver-leaf candlebark	NSW
Eucalyptus conglomerata	Swamp stringybark	QLD
Eucalyptus copulans		NSW
Eucalyptus crenulata	Silver gum, Buxton gum	VIC
Eucalyptus crucis subsp. praecipua	Paynes Find mallee	WA
Eucalyptus cuprea	Mallee box	WA
Eucalyptus dolorosa	Dandaragan mallee	WA
Eucalyptus gunnii subsp. divaricata	Miena cider gum	TAS
Eucalyptus imlayensis	Mount Imlay mallee	NSW
Eucalyptus impensa	Eneabba mallee	WA
Eucalyptus insularis	Twin Peak Island mallee	WA
Eucalyptus leprophloia	Scaly butt mallee, scaly-butt mallee	WA
Eucalyptus morrisbyi	Morrisbys gum	TAS
Eucalyptus pachycalyx subsp. banyabba	Banyabba shiny-barked gum	NSW
Eucalyptus phylacis	Meelup mallee	WA
Eucalyptus pruiniramis	Midlands gum, Jingymia gum	WA
Eucalyptus recta	Silver mallet	WA
Eucalyptus sp. Howes Swamp Creek (M. Doherty 19/7/1985 NSW 207054)		NSW
Euphrasia collina subsp. muelleri	Purple eyebright, Mueller's eyebright	VIC
Euphrasia collina subsp. osbornii	Osborn's eyebright	SA
Euphrasia semipicta	Peninsula eyebright	TAS
Euphrasia sp. fabula	Hairy cliff eyebright	TAS
Fimbristylis adjuncta		QLD
Fontainea oraria	Coastal fontainea	NSW
Frankenia conferta	Silky frankenia	WA
Frankenia parvula	Short-leaved frankenia	WA
Frankenia plicata	Sea heath	SA
Gardenia actinocarpa	Daintree gardenia	QLD
Gastrolobium glaucum	Spike poison, Wongan poison	WA
Gastrolobium graniticum	Granite poison	WA
Gastrolobium hamulosum	Hook-point poison	WA
Gastrolobium papilio	Butterfly poison, butterfly-leaved gastrolobia	WA
Geniostoma huttonii		Lord Howe Island
Genoplesium baueri	Yellow gnat-orchid	NSW
Genoplesium brachystachyum	Short-spiked midge-orchid	TAS
Genoplesium plumosum	Plumed midge-orchid	NSW
Genoplesium rhyoliticum	Pambula midge-orchid	NSW
Genoplesium tectum	Cardwell midge-orchid	QLD
Gentiana baeuerlenii	Bauerlen's gentian	ACT, NSW
Gentiana wingecarribiensis	Wingecarribee gentian	NSW
Gingidia montana	Mountain carrot	NSW
Glyceria drummondii	Nangetty grass	WA
Gossia fragrantissima	Sweet myrtle	NSW, QLD
Gossia gonoclada	Angle-stemmed myrtle	QLD
Graptophyllum reticulatum	Veiny graptophyllum	QLD
Grevillea acanthifolia subsp. paludosa	Bog grevillea	NSW
Grevillea althoferorum	Split-leaved grevillea	WA
Grevillea batrachioides	Mt Lesueur grevillea	WA
Grevillea beadleana	Beadle's grevillea	NSW
Grevillea caleyi	Caley's grevillea	NSW
Grevillea calliantha	Foote's grevillea, Cataby grevillea, black magic grevillea	WA
Grevillea corrugata	Bindoon grevillea	WA
Grevillea christineae	Christine's grevillea	WA
Grevillea curviloba subsp. curviloba	Curved-leaf grevillea	WA
Grevillea curviloba subsp. incurva	Narrow curved-leaf grevillea	WA
Grevillea dryandroides subsp. dryandroides	Phalanx grevillea	WA
Grevillea dryandroides subsp. hirsuta	Hairy phalanx grevillea	WA
Grevillea guthrieana	Guthrie's grevillea	NSW
Grevillea humifusa	Spreading grevillea	WA
Grevillea iaspicula	Wee Jasper grevillea	NSW
Grevillea infundibularis	Fan-leaf grevillea	WA
Grevillea involucrata	Lake Varley grevillea	WA
Grevillea maccutcheonii	McCutcheon's grevillea	WA
Grevillea masonii	Mason's grevillea	NSW
Grevillea maxwellii	Maxwell's grevillea	WA
Grevillea mollis		NSW
Grevillea molyneuxii	Molyneux' grevillea	NSW
Grevillea murex		WA
Grevillea obtusiflora	Grey grevillea	NSW
Grevillea pythara	Pythara grevillea	WA
Grevillea rara	Rare grevillea	WA
Grevillea rivularis	Carrington Falls grevillea	NSW
Grevillea scapigera	Corrigin grevillea	WA
Grevillea wilkinsonii	Tumut grevillea	NSW
Habenaria macraithii	Whiskered rein-orchid	QLD
Hakea dohertyi	Kowmung hakea	NSW
Hakea pulvinifera	Lake Keepit hakea	NSW
Haloragis eyreana	Prickly raspwort	SA
Haloragodendron lucasii	Hal	NSW
Helicteres macrothrix		NT
Hemiandra gardneri	Red snakebush	WA
Hemiandra rutilans	Sargent's snakebush	WA
Hibbertia basaltica	Basalt guinea-flower, Rogerville guinea-flower	TAS
Homoranthus decumbens		QLD
Huperzia carinata	Keeled tassel-fern	QLD
Huperzia dalhousieana	Blue tassel-fern	QLD
Huperzia filiformis	Rat's tail tassel-fern	QLD
Huperzia squarrosa	Rock tassel-fern, water tassel-fern	QLD
Hydatella dioica	One-sexed hydatella	WA
Hypocalymma longifolium	Long-leaved myrtle	WA
Hypolepis distans	Scrambling ground-fern	TAS
Indigofera efoliata	Leafless indigo	NSW
Irenepharsus trypherus	Delicate cress, Illawarra irene	NSW
Isoglossa eranthemoides		NSW
Isopogon uncinatus	Hook-leaf isopogon	WA
Jacksonia pungens J. Chappill ms.	Pungent jacksonia, stinkwood	WA
Jacksonia quairading J. Chappill ms.	Quairading jacksonia, Quairading stinkwood	WA
Jacksonia sp. Collie (C. J. Koch 177)	Collie jacksonia	WA
Kennedia macrophylla	Augusta kennedia	WA
Lachangrostis adamsonii	Adamson's blowngrass	VIC
Lachnagrostis limitanea	Spalding blowngrass	SA
Lambertia echinata subsp. echinata	Prickly honeysuckle	WA
Lambertia echinata subsp. occidentalis	Western prickly honeysuckle	WA
Lambertia fairallii	Fairalls honeysuckle	WA
Lambertia orbifolia	Roundleaf honeysuckle	WA
Lasiopetalum pterocarpum E. M. Benn. & K. Shepherd ms.	Wing-fruited lasiopetalum	WA
Lasiopetalum rotundifolium	Round-leaf lasiopetalum	WA
Lastreopsis calantha	Shield-fern	Norfolk Island
Lechenaultia laricina	Scarlet lechenaultia	WA
Leionema equestre	Kangaroo Island leionema	Kangaroo Island SA
Leionema lachnaeoides		NSW
Lepidium hyssopifolium	Basalt pepper-cress	NSW, QLD, TAS, VIC
Lepidium monoplocoides	Winged pepper-cress	NSW, VIC
Lepidium peregrinum	Wandering pepper-cress	NSW, QLD
Lepidosperma rostratum	Beaked lepidosperma	WA
Leucochrysum albicans var. tricolor	Hoary sunray	TAS, VIC
Leucopogon confertus	Torrington beard-heath	NSW
Leucopogon gnaphalioides	Stirling Range beard-heath	WA
Leucopogon marginatus	Thick-margined beard-heath	WA
Leucopogon obtectus	Hidden beard-heath	WA
Leucopogon sp. Coolmunda (D. Halford Q 1635)	Coolmunda beard-heath	QLD
Lychnothamnus barbatus		QLD
Macarthuria keigheryi	Keighery's macarthuria	WA
Macrozamia cranei		QLD
Macrozamia lomandroides		QLD
Macrozamia pauli-guilielmi	Pineapple zamia	QLD
Macrozamia platyrhachis		QLD
Marattia salicina	King fern, para, potato fern	Norfolk Island
Marianthus mollis	Hairy-fruited billardiera	WA
Melaleuca sciotostyla	Wongan welaleuca	WA
Melichrus hirsutus J. B. Williams ms.	Hairy melichrus	NSW, SA
Melichrus sp. Gibberagee (A. S. Benwell & J. B. Williams 97239)	Narrow-leaf melichrus	NSW
Microcarpaea agonis		QLD
Micromyrtus grandis		NSW
Microstrobos fitzgeraldii	Dwarf mountain pine, Blue Mountains dwarf pine	NSW
Microtis angusii	Angus' onion-orchid	NSW
Muehlenbeckia australis	Shrubby creeper, pohuehue	Norfolk Island
Muehlenbeckia tuggeranong	Tuggeranong lignum	ACT
Mukia sp. Longreach (D. Davidson AQ279935)	Tobermorey melon	QLD
Myoporum turbinatum	Salt myoporum	WA
Myriophyllum lapidicola	Chiddarcooping myriophyllum	WA
Myrsine richmondensis	Lismore muttonwood	NSW
Ochrosia moorei	Southern ochrosia	NSW, QLD
Olearia flocktoniae	Dorrigo daisy-bush	NSW
Olearia hygrophila	Swamp daisy, water daisy	QLD
Olearia microdisca	Small-flowered daisy-bush	SA
Orthrosanthus muelleri	South Stirling morning iris	WA
Pandanus spiralis var. flammeus	Edgar Range pandanus	WA
Paracaleana dixonii Hopper & A. P. Brown ms.	Sandplain duck orchid	WA
Parsonsia dorrigoensis	Milky silkpod	NSW
Patersonia spirafolia	Spiral-leaved patersonia	WA
Pennantia endlicheri	Pennantia, Norfolk Island brown beech	Norfolk Island
Persoonia hirsuta	Hairy geebung	NSW
Persoonia micranthera	Small-flowered snottygobble	WA
Persoonia mollis subsp. maxima	Calna Creek geebung	NSW
Persoonia nutans	Nodding geebung	NSW
Petrophile latericola Keighery ms.		WA
Phaius australis	Lesser swamp-orchid	NSW, QLD
Phaius bernaysii	Yellow swamp-orchid	QLD
Phaius tancarvilleae	Swamp lily, greater swamp-orchid	QLD
Phalaenopsis rosenstromii	Native moth orchid	QLD
Pherosphaera fitzgeraldii	Dwarf mountain pine	NSW
Philotheca basistyla	White-flowered philotheca, white waxflower	WA
Philotheca wonganensis	Wongan eriostemon	WA
Phlegmariurus carinatus	Keeled tassel-fern	QLD
Phlegmariurus dalhousieanus	Blue tassel-fern	QLD
Phlegmariurus filiformus	Rat's tail tassel-fern	QLD
Phreatia paleata syn. Eria paleata	An orchid	Norfolk Island
Pimelea spicata	Spiked rice-flower	NSW
Pimelea venosa	Bolivia Hill rice-flower	NSW
Pityrodia scabra	Wyalkatchem foxglove	WA
Planchonella costata	Bastard ironwood	Norfolk Island
Planchonella eerwah	Shiny-leaved condoo, black plum, wild apple	QLD
Plectranthus habrophyllus		QLD
Plectranthus nitidus	Nightcap plectranthus	NSW, QLD
Plectranthus omissus		QLD
Plectranthus torrenticola		QLD
Plesioneuron tuberculatum		QLD
Polystychum moorei	Rock Shield fern	Lord Howe Island
Pomaderris cotoneaster	Cotoneaster pomaderris	NSW, VIC
Prasophyllum affine	Culburra leek-orchid, Kinghorn Point leek-orchid, Jervis Bay leek orchid	NSW
Prasophyllum amoenum	Dainty leek-orchid	TAS
Prasophyllum apoxychilum	Tapered leek-orchid	TAS
Prasophyllum correctum	Gaping leek-orchid	TAS, VIC
Prasophyllum crebiflorum	Crowded leek-orchid	TAS
Prasophyllum diversiflorum	Gorae leek-orchid	VIC
Prasophyllum frenchii	Maroon leek-orchid, slaty leek-orchid, stout leek-orchid, French's leek-orchid	SA, VIC
Prasophyllum goldsackii	Goldsack's leek-orchid	SA
Prasophyllum petilum	Tarengo leek-orchid	ACT, NSW
Prasophyllum pruinosum	Plum leek-orchid	SA
Prasophyllum secutum	Northern leek-orchid	TAS
Prasophyllum suaveolens	Fragrant leek-orchid	VIC
Prasophyllum subbisectum	Pomonal leek-orchid	VIC
Prasophyllum tunbridgense	Tunbridge leek-orchid	TAS
Prasophyllum uroglossum	Wingecarribee leek-orchid, dark leek-orchid	NSW
Prostanthera askania	Tranquility mintbush	NSW
Prostanthera eurybioides	Monarto mintbush	SA
Prostanthera junonis	Somersby mintbush	NSW
Pteris kingiana	King's brakefern	Norfolk Island
Pteris zahlbruckneriana	Netted brakefern	Norfolk Island
Pterostylis aenigma	Enigmatic greenhood	VIC
Pterostylis atriola	Snug greenhood	TAS
Pterostylis basaltica	Basalt greenhood	VIC
Pterostylis despectans	Lowly greenhood	SA, VIC
Pterostylis gibbosa	Illawarra greenhood, rufa greenhood, pouched greenhood	NSW
Pterostylis lepida	Halbury greenhood	SA
Pterostylis rubenachii	Arthur River greenhood	TAS
Pterostylis saxicola	Sydney Plains greenhood	NSW
Pterostylis sinuata	Western Swan greenhood, Northampton midget greenhood	WA
Pterostylis sp. Botany Bay (A. Bishop J221/1-13)	Botany Bay bearded greenhood	NSW
Pterostylis sp. Hale (R. Bates 21725)	Hale dwarf greenhood	SA
Pterostylis ziegeleri	Cape Portland greenhood	TAS
Ptilotus fasciculatus	Fitzgerald's mulla-mulla	WA
Ptychosperma bleeseri	Darwin palm	NT
Pultenaea elusa	Elusive bush-pea	NSW
Pultenaea selaginoides	Clubmoss bush-pea	TAS
Pultanea trichophylla	Tufted bush-pea	SA (Eyre Peninsula)
Randia moorei	Spiny gardenia	NSW, QLD
Ranunculus prasinus	Tunbridge buttercup	TAS
Rhizanthella gardneri	Underground orchid, western underground orchid	WA
Rhizanthella slaterii	Eastern underground orchid	NSW
Ricinocarpos trichophorus	Barrens wedding bush	WA
Roycea pycnophylloides	Saltmat	WA
Commersonia prostrata	Dwarf kerrawang	NSW, VIC
Commersonia erythrogyna	Trigwell's rulingia	WA
Rutidosis leptorrhynchoides	Button wrinklewort	ACT, NSW, VIC
Sagina diemensis	Pearlwort	TAS
Samadera sp. Moonee Creek (J. King s.n. 1949)	Moonee Creek quassia	NSW
Sankowskya stipularis		QLD
Schoenia filifolia subsp. subulifolia	Mingenew everlasting	WA
Sclerolaena napiformis	Turnip copperbur	NSW, VIC
Senecio behrianus	Stiff groundsel	VIC
Senecio evansianus		Norfolk Island
Solanum dissectum		QLD
Solanum graniticum		QLD
Solanum johnsonianum		QLD
Sphenotoma drummondii	Mountain paper heath	WA
Spirogardnera rubescens	Spiral bush	WA
Spyridium microphyllum	Small-leafed spyridium	TAS
Spyridium sp. (Little Desert)	Forked spyridium	VIC
Stemodia haegii W. R. Barker ms.		SA
Stenanthemum pimeleoides	Spreading stenanthemum	TAS
Stipa wakoolica	Wakool spear-grass	NSW, VIC
Stockwellia quadrifida	Vic Stockwell's puzzle	QLD
Stonesiella selaginoides	Clubmoss push-pea	TAS East Coast
Streblus pendulinus	Siah's backbone, Sia's backbone, Isaac wood	Norfolk Island
Stylidium coroniforme	Wongan Hills triggerplant, Wongan triggerplant	WA
Swainsona recta	Small purple-pea, mountain Swainson-pea	ACT, NSW, VIC
Symonanthus bancroftii	Bancrofts symonanthus	WA
Synaphea quartzitica	Quartz-loving synaphea	WA
Synaphea stenoloba	Dwellingup synaphea	WA
Tectaria devexa	Cave fern	Christmas Island, QLD
Tetratheca deltoidea	Granite tetratheca	WA
Tetratheca paynterae	Paynter's tetratheca	WA
Thelymitra epipactoides	Metallic sun-orchid	SA, VIC
Thelymitra manginii K. Dixon & Batty ms.	Cinnamon sun-orchid	WA
Thelymitra stellata	Star sun-orchid	WA
Thomasia sp. Green Hill (S. Paust 1322)	Green Hill thomasia	WA
Toechima pterocarpum	Orange tamarind	QLD
Toechima sp. East Alligator (J. Russell-Smith 8418) NT Herbarium	Steelwood	NT
Trachymene scapigera	Mountain trachymene	NSW
Triplarina imbricata	Creek heath-myrtle	NSW
Triplarina nowraensis	Nowra heath-myrtle	NSW
Trithuria occidentalis	Swan hydatella	WA
Triunia robusta	Glossy spice-bush	QLD
Typhonium jonesii	A herb	NT
Typhonium mirabile	A herb	NT
Typhonium taylorii	A herb	NT
Uromyrtus australis	Peach myrtle	NSW
Verticordia albida	White featherflower	WA
Verticordia densiflora var. pedunculata	Long-stalked featherflower	WA
Verticordia fimbrilepis var. fimbrilepis	Shy featherflower	WA
Verticordia hughanii	Hughan's featherflower	WA
Verticordia pityrhops	Pine featherflower	WA
Verticordia plumosa var. ananeotes	Tuft-plumed featherflower	WA
Verticordia plumosa var. pleiobotrya	Narrow-petalled featherflower	WA
Verticordia plumosa var. vassensis	Vasse featherflower	WA
Verticordia spicata subsp. squamosa	Scaly-leaved featherflower	WA
Verticordia staminosa subsp. cylindracea	Granite featherflower	WA
Villarsia calthifolia	Mountain villarsia	WA
Vincetoxicum forsteri, syn. Tylophora linearis		NSW, QLD
Vincetoxicum rupicola, syn. Tylophora rupicola		QLD
Vincetoxicum woollsii, syn. Tylophora woollsii		NSW, QLD
Vrydagzynea paludosa	Tonsil orchid	QLD
Westringia crassifolia	Whipstick westringia	VIC
Westringia kydrensis	Kydra westringia	NSW
Wollemia nobilis	Wollemi pine	NSW
Wurmbea calcicola	Naturaliste Nancy	WA
Wurmbea tubulosa	Long-flowered Nancy	WA
Xanthorrhoea bracteata	Shiny grasstree	TAS
Xanthostemon formosus		QLD
Xerothamnella herbacea		QLD
Xylopia sp. Melville Island (J. Russell-Smith 2148) NT Herbarium	A shrub	NT
Xylosma parvifolia	Mountain xylosma	Lord Howe Island
Zehneria baueriana	Native cucumber, giant cucumber	AET (Norfolk Is)
Zieria adenophora	Araluen zieria	NSW
Zieria baeuerlenii J. A. Armstrong ms.	Bomaderry Creek zieria	NSW
Zieria bifida	Brolga Park zieria	QLD (Triunia NP)
Zieria buxijugum J. Briggs & J. A. Armstrong ms.	Box Range zieria	NSW
Zieria covenyi J. A. Armstrong ms.	Coveny's zieria	NSW
Zieria floydii J. A. Armstrong ms.	Floyd's zieria	NSW
Zieria formosa J. Briggs & J. A. Armstrong ms.	Shapely zieria	NSW
Zieria granulata	Hill zieria, Illawarra zieria	NSW
Zieria ingramii J. A. Armstrong ms.	Ingram's zieria	NSW
Zieria lasiocaulis J. A. Armstrong ms.	Willi willi zieria	NSW
Zieria obcordata		NSW
Zieria parrisiae J. Briggs & J. A. Armstrong ms.	Parris' zieria	NSW
Zieria prostrata J. A. Armstrong ms.	Headland zieria	NSW

== See also ==
- Flora of Australia
- List of extinct flora of Australia
- ROTAP
- Threatened fauna of Australia
