= ROTAP =

List of rare or threatened Australian plants

Rare or Threatened Australian Plants, usually abbreviated to ROTAP, is a list of rare or threatened Australian plant taxa. Developed and maintained by the Commonwealth Scientific and Industrial Research Organisation (CSIRO), the most recent edition lists 5031 taxa. The list uses a binary coding system based on the IUCN Red List categories for "Presumed Extinct", "Endangered", "Vulnerable", "Rare" or "Poorly Known". However, it also provides for additional information such as geographic range and occurrence in protected areas.

It was first compiled in 1979, and published in 1981, with revisions published in 1988 and 1996. In its early days it was the only nationally recognised list of threatened plants, although it had no legal status. When the Endangered Species Protection Act 1992 was proclaimed, the ROTAP list was used as a basis for the publication of schedules to the Act. A third list was produced by ANZECC from 1996. In 2000, the Environment Protection and Biodiversity Conservation Act 1999 (EPBC Act) was proclaimed. This superseded the Endangered Species Protection Act 1992, and published a single list of threatened flora which largely superseded the three lists then current. As the EPBC list has legal force, the ROTAP list is now little used. It continues to be maintained, however, and is often used and referred to in scientific publications.

== See also ==
- List of threatened flora of Australia
- Threatened fauna of Australia
