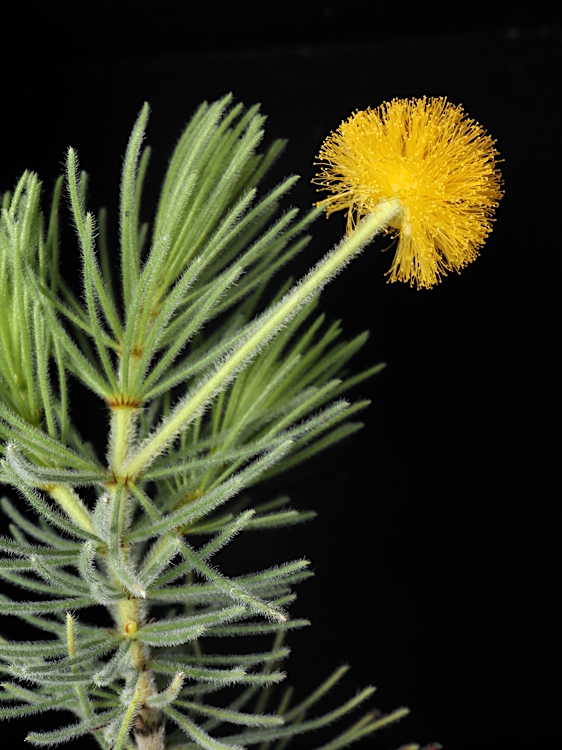
- In the Australian National Botanic Gardens

Conservation status
- Critically endangered (EPBC Act)

Scientific classification
- Kingdom: Plantae
- Clade: Tracheophytes
- Clade: Angiosperms
- Clade: Eudicots
- Clade: Rosids
- Order: Fabales
- Family: Fabaceae
- Subfamily: Caesalpinioideae
- Clade: Mimosoid clade
- Genus: Acacia
- Species: A. equisetifolia

Binomial name
- Acacia equisetifolia Maslin & Cowie

= Acacia equisetifolia =

Species of legume

Acacia equisetifolia is a species of flowering plant in the family Fabaceae and is endemic to the Northern Territory of Australia. It is an erect shrub with crowded whorls of slender phyllodes with stipules at the base, heads of bright yellow flowers in each whorl and oblong to narrowly oblong, crusty pods.

== Description ==
Acacia equisetifolia is an erect shrub that typically grows to a height of up to about 1 m (3 ft 3 in) and has branchlets densely covered with weak, white, shaggy hairs. The phyllodes are arranged in crowded whorls of 10 to 17, 15–20 mm (0.59–0.79 in) long, 0.3–0.4 mm (0.012–0.016 in) wide and 2–7 mm (0.079–0.276 in) apart. There are very narrowly triangular stipules 1–2 mm (0.039–0.079 in) long at the base of the phyllodes and a small point 0.1–0.3 mm (0.0039–0.0118 in) on the end. The flowers are borne in a spherical head on a densely hairy peduncle mostly 15–30 mm (0.59–1.18 in) long. Each head is 7–9 mm (0.28–0.35 in) in diameter (when dry), with 30 to 35 bright yellow flowers. Flowering has been observed in February, and the pods are sessile, oblong to narrowly oblong, 10–30 mm (0.39–1.18 in) long and 8–10 mm (0.31–0.39 in) wide and thinly crusty, flat but obviously raised over the seeds. The pods are straight, blackish, sticky and veinless. The seeds are oblong, 4.5–5.0 mm (0.18–0.20 in) long and 2.5–3.0 mm (0.098–0.118 in) wide with a folded aril.

== Taxonomy ==
Acacia equisetifolia was first formally described in 2014 by Bruce Maslin and Ian Cowie in Nuytsia from specimens collected in Kakadu National Park in 2004. The specific epithet (equisetifolia) alludes to the "superficial similarity of the phyllodes, especially their shape and arrangement, to species of Equisetum".

== Distribution and habitat ==
This species of wattle has been recorded as growing on rocky sandstone slopes and ledges at the tops of sheer cliffs, and is known only from Graveside Gorge in Kakadu National Park. It has a very restricted distribution, with a total recorded population of less than 1,000 mature individuals distributed "quite unequally across two subpopulations about 1 km (0.62 mi) apart".

== Conservation status ==
Assessment against the IUCN criteria has led to the species being listed under both Commonwealth and Northern Territory legislation as critically endangered. It is threatened because of its very low extent and area of occurrence, extreme fluctuations in numbers, and unfavourable fire regimes for a possibly obligate seeder, placing it at risk of rapid extinction.

== See also ==
- List of Acacia species
