= Styphelia obtecta =

Scientific classification
- Kingdom: Plantae
- Clade: Tracheophytes
- Clade: Angiosperms
- Clade: Eudicots
- Clade: Asterids
- Order: Ericales
- Family: Ericaceae
- Genus: Styphelia
- Species: S. obtecta

Binomial name
- Styphelia obtecta (Benth.) F.Muell.
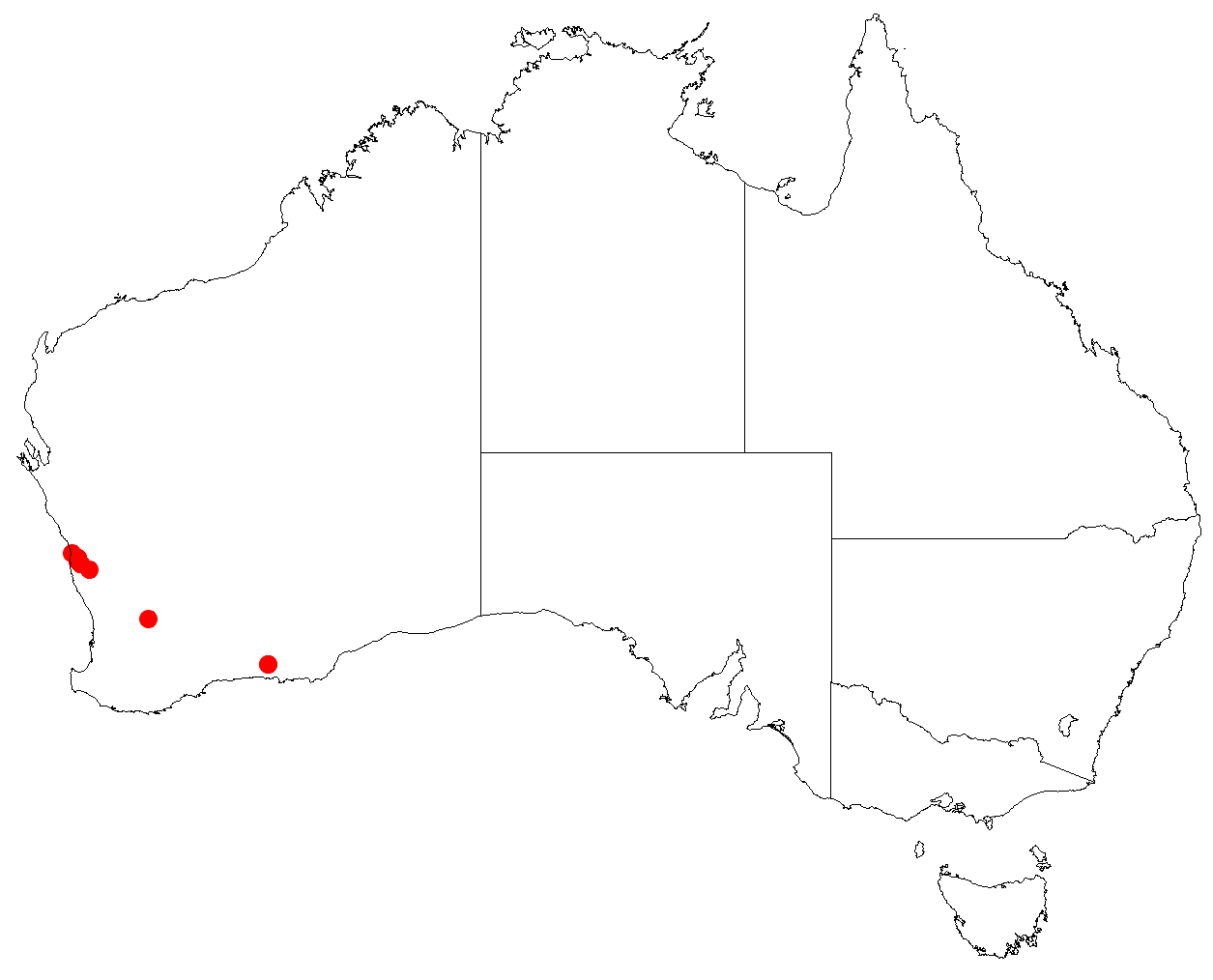
- Occurrence data from AVH

Synonyms
- Leucopogon obtectus Benth.

Species of plant

Styphelia obtecta is a species of flowering plant in the heath family Ericaceae and is endemic to the south-west of Western Australia. It is a shrub that typically grows to a height of 1–2 ft (0.30–0.61 m) or more. Its leaves are rigid, broadly heart-shaped to round, and 8.5–12.5 mm (0.33–0.49 in) long and overlap each other with a small point on the tip. The flowers are arranged singly or in pairs in leaf axils and are shorter than the leaves. There are small bracts and broad bracteoles less than half as long as the sepals. The sepals are about 4 mm (0.16 in) long, the petals are joined at the base to form a tube about as long as the sepals with lobes shorter than the petal tube.

The species was first formally described in 1868 by George Bentham who gave it the name Leucopogon obtectus in his Flora Australiensis, from specimens collected by James Drummond between the Moore and Murchison Rivers. In 1882, Ferdinand von Mueller transferred the species to Styphelia as S. obtecta in his Systematic Census of Australian Plants. The specific epithet (obtecta) means "protected", referring to the glaucous foliage.

Styphelia obtecta occurs in the Geraldton Sandplains bioregion of south-western Western Australia and is listed as "Threatened" by the Western Australian Government Department of Biodiversity, Conservation and Attractions, meaning that it is in danger of extinction.
