= Daviesia microcarpa =

Norseman pea

Conservation status
- Endangered (EPBC Act)

Scientific classification
- Kingdom: Plantae
- Clade: Tracheophytes
- Clade: Angiosperms
- Clade: Eudicots
- Clade: Rosids
- Order: Fabales
- Family: Fabaceae
- Subfamily: Faboideae
- Genus: Daviesia
- Species: D. microcarpa

Binomial name
- Daviesia microcarpa Crisp

Species of flowering plant

Daviesia microcarpa, commonly known as Norseman pea, is a species of flowering plant in the family Fabaceae and is endemic to two small areas of inland Western Australia. It is a sprawling shrub with tangled stems and crowded, needle-shaped, sharply-pointed phyllodes, and orange and pinkish-red flowers.

== Description ==
Daviesia microcarpa is a sprawling shrub, typically up to 0.4 m (1 ft 4 in) high and 1 m (3 ft 3 in) wide with many weak, tangled stems. Its phyllodes are crowded, needle-shaped and sharply pointed, 8–20 mm (0.31–0.79 in) long and 0.5–0.75 mm (0.020–0.030 in) wide. The flowers are arranged singly or in pairs in leaf axils on a peduncle 0.5–1.5 mm (0.020–0.059 in) long, each flower on a pedicel about 1 mm (0.039 in) long with oblong bracts 0.75–1 mm (0.030–0.039 in) long at the base. The sepals are about 3 mm (0.12 in) long and joined at the base, the lobes more or less similar, triangular and about 0.5 mm (0.020 in) long. The standard petal is egg-shaped, about 4–5 mm (0.16–0.20 in) long and orange with pinkish red markings, the wings 4.0–4.5 mm (0.16–0.18 in) long and pinkish red, and the keel about 3.5–4.0 mm (0.14–0.16 in) long and pale orange-pink. Flowering occurs in August and September and the fruit is a triangular pod 4.0–4.5 mm (0.16–0.18 in) long.

== Taxonomy and naming ==
Daviesia microcarpa was first formally described in 1995 by Michael Crisp in Australian Systematic Botany from specimens collected near Norseman in 1979. The specific epithet (microcarpa) means "small-fruited", referring to the phyllodes.

== Distribution and habitat ==
This daviesia grows in sandy soil in woodland and is known from two disjunct populations, near Norseman where 13 plants were recorded in March 2010, and Southern Cross where there were 39 plants, in the Coolgardie biogeographic region of inland Western Australia.

== Conservation status ==
Daviesia microcarpa is listed as "endangered" under the Australian Government Environment Protection and Biodiversity Conservation Act 1999 and as "Threatened Flora (Declared Rare Flora — Extant)" by the Department of Biodiversity, Conservation and Attractions and a recovery plan has been prepared. The main threats to the species include its short life span and limited numbers of young plants, change in hydrology as a result of road works, and inappropriate fire regimes. Translocations have been conducted near Norseman with some plants setting seed, but in 2008 all the translocated plants were destroyed by vandals.
