= Acacia aprica =

Blunt wattle

Conservation status
- Endangered (EPBC Act)

Scientific classification
- Kingdom: Plantae
- Clade: Tracheophytes
- Clade: Angiosperms
- Clade: Eudicots
- Clade: Rosids
- Order: Fabales
- Family: Fabaceae
- Subfamily: Caesalpinioideae
- Clade: Mimosoid clade
- Genus: Acacia
- Species: A. aprica

Binomial name
- Acacia aprica Maslin & A.R.Chapman
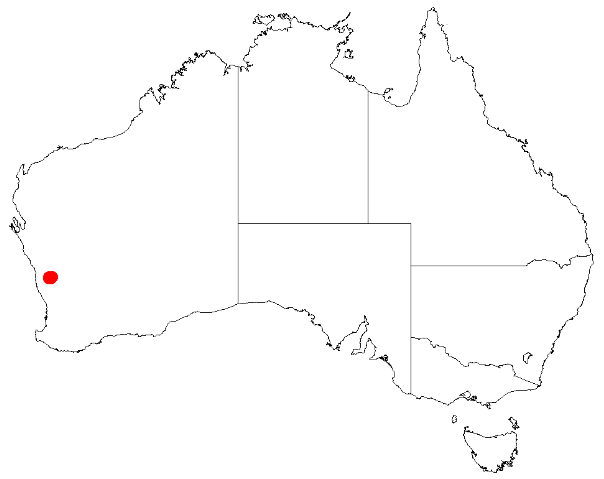
- Occurrence data from AVH

Synonyms
- Racosperma apricum (Maslin & A.R.Chapm.) Pedley

Species of legume

Acacia aprica, commonly known as blunt wattle, is a species of flowering plant in the family Fabaceae and is endemic to a restricted part of the south-west of Western Australia. It is a diffuse, open, spreading shrub sessile, incurved phyllodes that are circular to 4-sided in cross section, and one or two racemes of heads of 40 to 55, usually golden flowers, and linear, crust-like pods up to 60 mm (2.4 in) long.

== Description ==
Acacia aprica is a diffuse, open, spreading shrub that typically grows to a height of 0.3–2 m (1 ft 0 in – 6 ft 7 in) and has its branchlets densely covered with silvery, silky hairs between its ribs. Its phyllodes are more or less sessile, curved, circular to 4-sided in cross section, 5–11 mm (0.20–0.43 in) long and 1.0–1.5 mm (0.039–0.059 in) wide. The phyllodes are covered with silky, silvery hairs when young, and there are eight broad, longitudinal veins with a dark furrow between the veins. The flowers are borne in one or two racemes of more or less spherical heads to oblong heads of flowers in axils on a peduncle up to 2 mm (0.079 in) long. Each head contains 40 to 55 usually golden flowers. Flowering occurs from June to August, and the pod is a linear, crust-like pod up to 60 mm (2.4 in) long and 2 mm (0.079 in) wide. The pods contain oblong to elliptic seeds 2.5–3.0 mm (0.098–0.118 in) long.

== Taxonomy ==
Acacia aprica was first formally described in 1999 by Bruce Maslin and Alexander Robert Chapman in the journal Nuytsia from specimens Maslin collected near Coorow in 1976. The specific epithet (aprica) means "uncovered", referring to the open habit of this species.

== Distribution and habitat ==
Blunt wattle grows on plains and rocky hills between Carnamah and Coorow in the Avon Wheatbelt and Geraldton Sandplains bioregions of south-western Western Australia.

== Conservation status ==
This species of wattle is listed as "endangered" under the Australian Government Environment Protection and Biodiversity Conservation Act 1999 the IUCN redlist, and as "Threatened Flora (Declared Rare Flora — Extant)" by the Government of Western Australia Department of Biodiversity, Conservation and Attractions. The main threats to the species include weed invasion, habitat loss, disturbance and modification, and inappropriate fire regimes.

== See also ==
- List of Acacia species
