= Senecio evansianus =

Conservation status
- Endangered (EPBC Act)

Scientific classification
- Kingdom: Plantae
- Clade: Embryophytes
- Clade: Tracheophytes
- Clade: Spermatophytes
- Clade: Angiosperms
- Clade: Eudicots
- Clade: Asterids
- Order: Asterales
- Family: Asteraceae
- Genus: Senecio
- Species: S. evansianus

Binomial name
- Senecio evansianus Belcher, 1992

Species of flowering plant in the daisy family

Senecio evansianus is a flowering plant in the daisy family. It is endemic to the Australian external territory of Norfolk Island in the south-west Pacific Ocean. It was originally described in 1992 by American botanist Robert Orange Belcher.

== Description ==
The species grows as a low herb up to 30 cm in height, with small yellow daisy flowers.

== Distribution and habitat ==
The plants are restricted to well-watered clay soils beneath open stands of Norfolk Island pine. Threats include competition with invasive weeds such as kikuyu grass. The species conservation status has been assessed as Endangered.
