= Pterostylis atriola =

Snug greenhood

Scientific classification
- Kingdom: Plantae
- Clade: Tracheophytes
- Clade: Angiosperms
- Clade: Monocots
- Order: Asparagales
- Family: Orchidaceae
- Subfamily: Orchidoideae
- Tribe: Cranichideae
- Genus: Pterostylis
- Species: P. atriola

Binomial name
- Pterostylis atriola D.L.Jones

Synonyms
- Speculantha atriola (D.L.Jones) D.L.Jones & M.A.Clem.

Species of orchid

Pterostylis atriola, commonly known as the Snug greenhood, is a species of orchid endemic to Tasmania. As with similar orchids, the flowering plants differ from those which are not flowering. The non-flowering plants only have a rosette of leaves but the flowering plants have one or two rosettes on growths from the base and up to ten small, dark green, white and brown flowers on a relatively tall flowering spike. It is a rare species, only known from four widely separated populations.

== Description ==
Pterostylis atriola is a terrestrial, perennial, deciduous, herb with an underground tuber and when not flowering, a rosette of three to six egg-shaped leaves 5–14 mm (0.2–0.6 in) long and 4–9 mm (0.2–0.4 in) wide. Flowering plants have up to ten well-spaced flowers about 9 mm (0.4 in) long and 2 mm (0.08 in) wide borne on a flowering spike 150–350 mm (6–10 in) high. There are three to five stem leaves 10–16 mm (0.4–0.6 in) long wrapped around the flower spike. The flowers are dark green and white, brown near the tip with two to four flowers are open at any time. The dorsal sepal and petals are fused, forming a hood or "galea" over the column. The dorsal sepal curves forward and has a short point. The lateral sepals are erect, held closely against the galea with thread-like tips about 3mm long which barely project above the galea. The sinus between the bases of the lateral sepals is flat and the opening in front of the flower is only about 1 mm (0.04 in) wide. The labellum is about 3 mm (0.1 in) long and is not visible from outside the intact flower. Flowering occurs from January to April.

== Taxonomy and naming ==
Pterostylis atriola was first formally described in 1998 by David Jones and the description was published in the Australian Orchid Research from a specimen collected on the plains near Snug. The specific epithet (atriola) is from the Latin atriolum, 'small room', 'hall' or 'vestibule', and refers to the small opening in the front of the flower.

== Distribution and habitat ==
The Snug greenhood usually grows in stony places in dry forest with scattered shrubs. It occurs in Tasmania in separated locations from areas near the coast to altitudes of 600 m (2,000 ft).

== Conservation ==
Pterostylis atriola was previously listed as "endangered" under the Australian Government Environment Protection and Biodiversity Conservation Act 1999. When the species was first described, the population was estimated to be about 100 individuals, but was subsequently raised to about 1,000 when more populations were discovered. It is listed as "rare" under the Tasmanian Government Threatened Species Protection Act 1995.
