= Pultenaea sp. Genowlan Point =

Conservation status
- Critically endangered (EPBC Act)

Scientific classification
- Kingdom: Plantae
- Clade: Tracheophytes
- Clade: Angiosperms
- Clade: Eudicots
- Clade: Rosids
- Order: Fabales
- Family: Fabaceae
- Subfamily: Faboideae
- Clade: Mirbelioids
- Genus: Pultenaea
- Species: P. sp. Genowlan Point

Binomial name
- Pultenaea sp. Genowlan Point

Species of legume

Pultenaea sp. Genowlan Point is a critically endangered undescribed species of flowering plant in the family Fabaceae–Faboideae. It is only known from one population at Genowlan Point (33.08535°S 150.07341°E) in the Capertee Valley within the Rylstone local government area of New South Wales.
