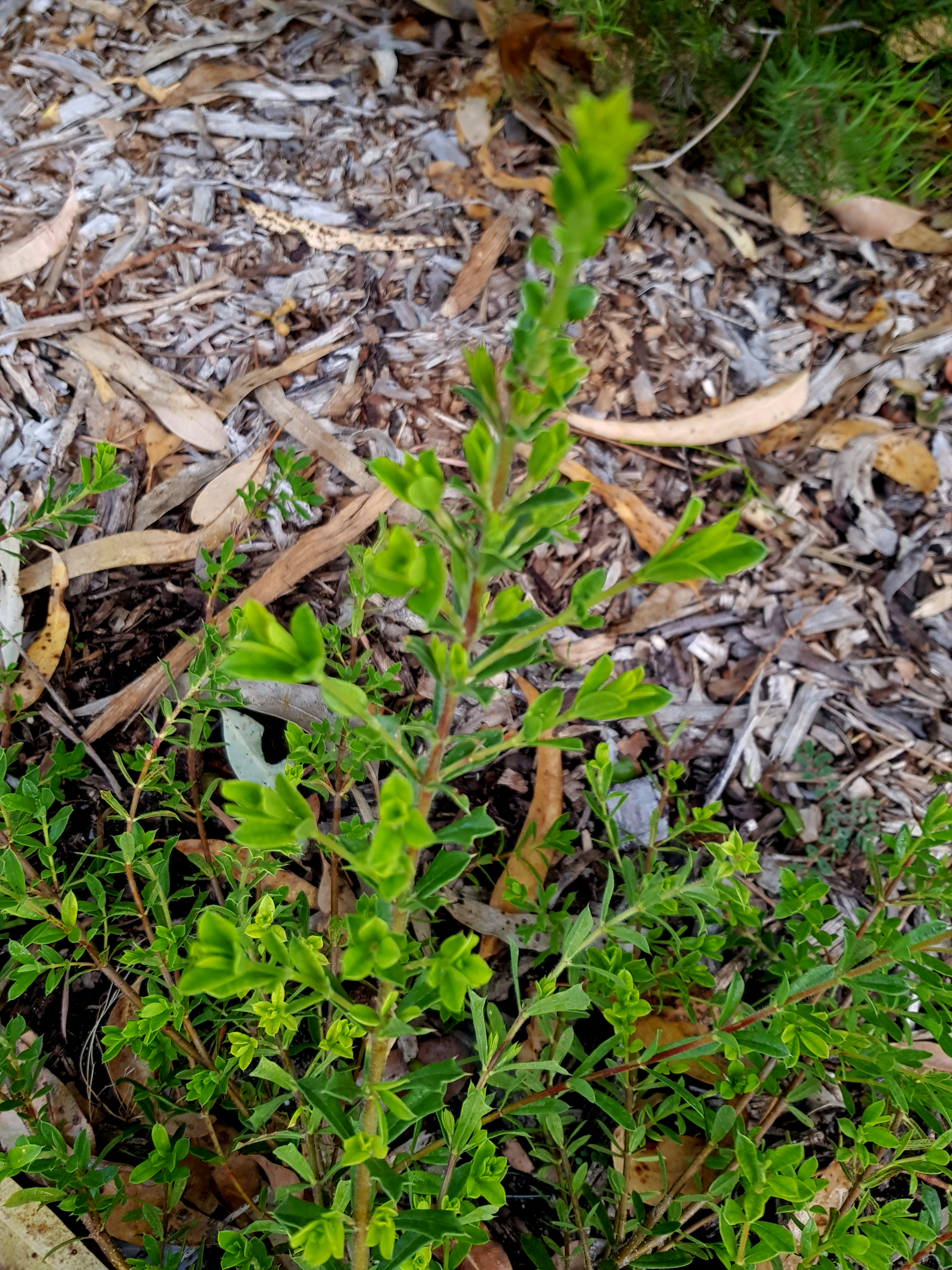
- Lambertia echinata subsp. occidentalis

Scientific classification
- Kingdom: Plantae
- Clade: Tracheophytes
- Clade: Angiosperms
- Clade: Eudicots
- Order: Proteales
- Family: Proteaceae
- Genus: Lambertia
- Species: L. echinata

Binomial name
- Lambertia echinata R.Br.

= Lambertia echinata =

Species of shrub endemic to Western Australia

Lambertia echinata, commonly known as prickly honeysuckle, is a shrub which is endemic to the south-west of Western Australia. It can grow up to 3 meters (9.8 ft) tall.

Three subspecies are recognised:

- subsp. echinata
- subsp. citrina
- subsp. occidentalis
