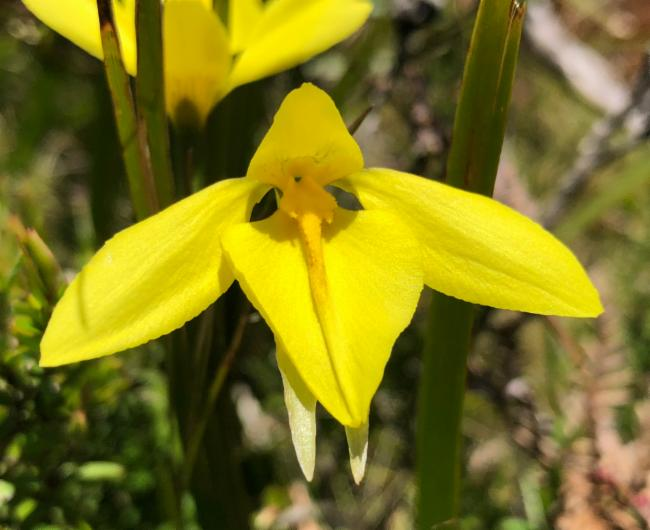
- In north-west Tasmania

Conservation status
- Endangered (EPBC Act)

Scientific classification
- Kingdom: Plantae
- Clade: Embryophytes
- Clade: Tracheophytes
- Clade: Angiosperms
- Clade: Monocots
- Order: Asparagales
- Family: Orchidaceae
- Subfamily: Orchidoideae
- Tribe: Diurideae
- Genus: Diuris
- Species: D. lanceolata

Binomial name
- Diuris lanceolata Lindl.

Synonyms
- Diuris pedunculata var. lanceolata (Lindl.) Domin

= Diuris lanceolata =

Large golden moths

Species of orchid

Diuris lanceolata, commonly known as large golden moths, is a species of orchid that is endemic to Tasmania. It has between two and four leaves and up to three golden to orange-yellow flowers with a few dark streaks.

== Description ==
Diuris lanceolata is a tuberous, perennial herb with between two and four narrow linear leaves 50–180 mm (2–7 in) long and 1–3 mm (0.04–0.1 in) wide. Up to three golden yellow to orange-yellow flowers with a few dark streaks, 25–40 mm (1–2 in) wide are borne on a flowering stem 60–250 mm (2–10 in) tall. The dorsal sepal is egg-shaped, angled upwards, 9–17 mm (0.4–0.7 in) long, 7–13 mm (0.3–0.5 in) wide with a tapered tip. The lateral sepals turn downwards below the horizontal, narrow lance-shaped with the narrower end towards the base, 15–25 mm (0.6–1 in) long, 2–3 mm (0.08–0.1 in) wide and parallel to each other. The petals are held horizontally, egg-shaped to lance-shaped, 10–18 mm (0.4–0.7 in) long and 5–8.5 mm (0.2–0.3 in) wide on a green stalk 3–6 mm (0.1–0.2 in) long. The labellum is 14–22 mm (0.6–0.9 in) long and has three lobes. The centre lobe is egg-shaped, 10–15 mm (0.4–0.6 in) long and 8.5–13 mm (0.3–0.5 in) wide. The side lobes are erect, oblong to wedge-shaped, 3–5.5 mm (0.1–0.2 in) long and 2–3 mm (0.08–0.1 in) wide with irregular edges. There are pimply callus ridges 7–10 mm (0.3–0.4 in) long at the base of the mid-line of the labellum. Flowering occurs from November to February.

== Taxonomy and naming ==
Diuris lanceolata was first formally described by John Lindley in his 1840 book The Genera and Species of Orchidaceous Plants. The specific epithet (lanceolata) is a Latin word meaning "spear-like".

== Distribution and habitat ==
Large golden moths is currently only known from one location on the north coast and one on the west coast of Tasmania, growing in wet grassland, in heath and in coastal scrub.

== Conservation ==
Diuris lanceolata is classified as "endangered" under the Australian government Environment Protection and Biodiversity Conservation Act 1999 and the Tasmanian government Threatened Species Protection Act 1995.
