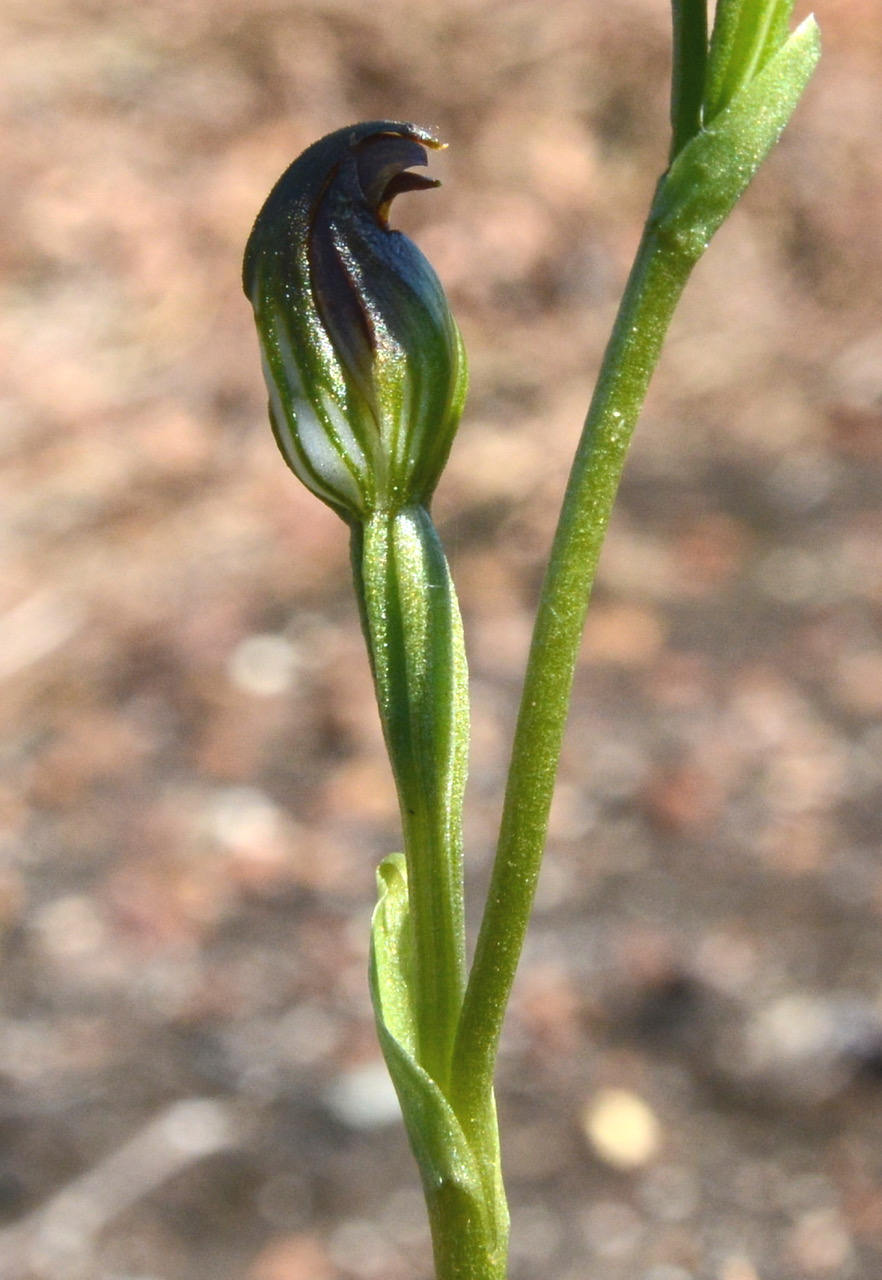
- Pterostylis vernalis near Nowra

Conservation status
- Critically endangered (EPBC Act)

Scientific classification
- Kingdom: Plantae
- Clade: Tracheophytes
- Clade: Angiosperms
- Clade: Monocots
- Order: Asparagales
- Family: Orchidaceae
- Subfamily: Orchidoideae
- Tribe: Cranichideae
- Genus: Pterostylis
- Species: P. vernalis

Binomial name
- Pterostylis vernalis (D.L.Jones) G.N.Backh.

Synonyms
- Speculantha vernalis D.L.Jones

= Pterostylis vernalis =

Spring tiny greenhood

Species of orchid

Pterostylis vernalis, commonly known as the spring tiny greenhood, is a species of orchid endemic to New South Wales. As with similar orchids, the flowering plants differ from those that are not currently flowering. Non-flowering plants have a rosette of leaves at the base. Flowering plants lack that rosette, but have one or two rosettes on lateral growths. The flowers are green, brown and white. This greenhood is only known from a small area near Nowra.

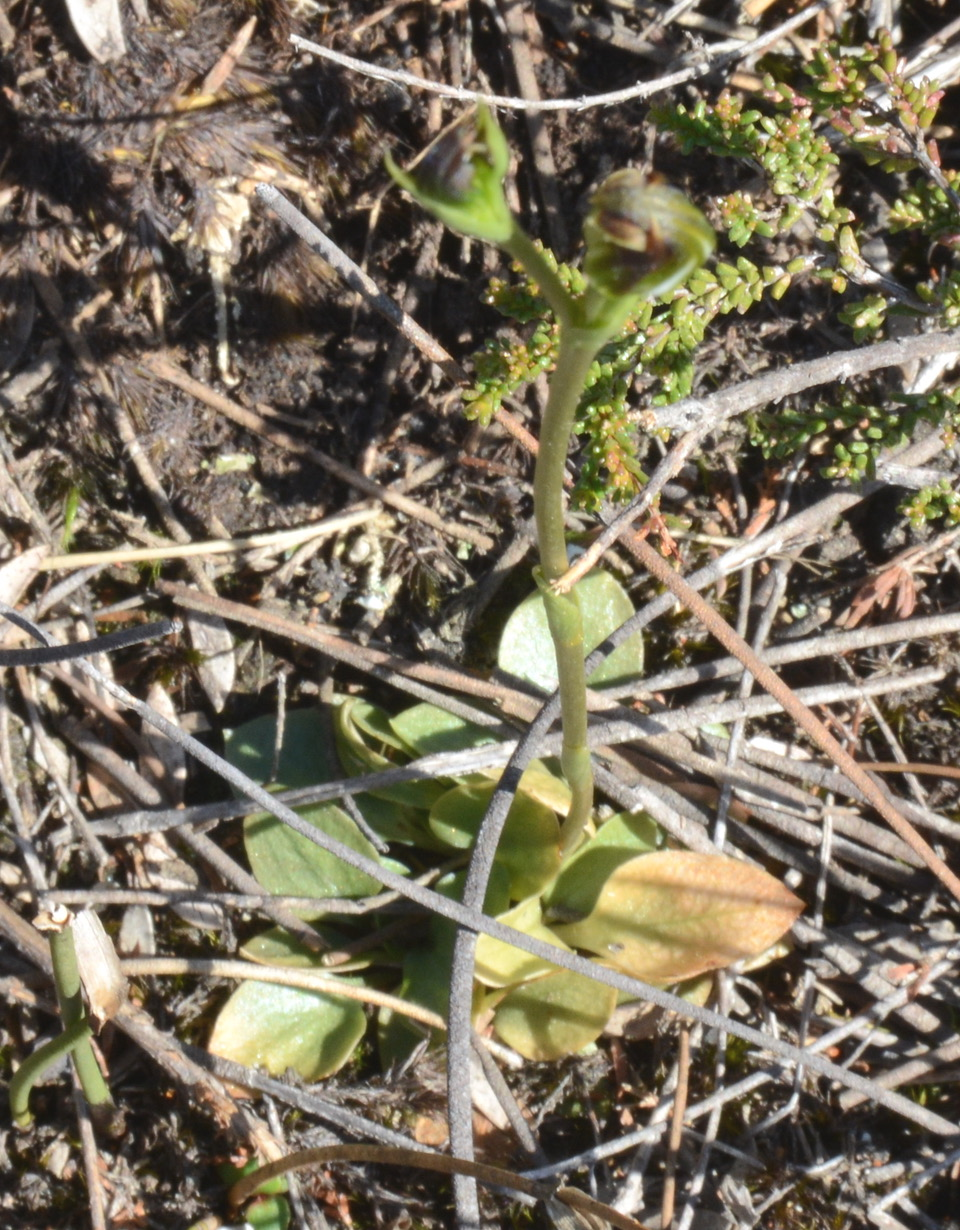
leaf rosette

== Description ==
Pterostylis vernalis is a terrestrial, perennial, deciduous, herb with an underground tuber and when not flowering, a rosette of three to seven egg-shaped, dark green leaves 5–15 mm (0.2–0.6 in) long and 4–10 mm (0.2–0.4 in) wide. Flowering plants have up to four flowers but not all are open at the same time. The flowers are 8–10 mm (0.3–0.4 in) long, about 4 mm (0.2 in) wide, green with a white patch near the base and dark brown near the tip. They are borne on a thin, wiry flowering stem 100–200 mm (4–8 in) high, each flower on a separate pedicel 1–9 mm (0.04–0.4 in) long. The dorsal sepal and petals are fused, forming a hood or "galea" over the column. The dorsal sepal is erect near its base, then curves forward in a semi-circle, the dorsal sepal slightly longer than the petals. The lateral sepals partly close off the front of the flower and are erect, in close contact with the galea with their tips about the same height as the top of the galea. The labellum is 3–4 mm (0.1–0.2 in) long, 1–2 mm (0.04–0.08 in) and barely visible from outside the intact flower. Flowering occurs in spring.

== Taxonomy and naming ==
The spring tiny greenhood was first formally described in 2006 by David Jones who gave it the name Speculantha vernalis. (It had previously been known as Pterostylis sp. 'Flat Rock Creek'.) The description was published in The Orchadian from a specimen collected near Flat Rock Creek Reservoir near Nowra. In 2010 Gary Backhouse changed the name to Pterostylis vernalis. The specific epithet (vernalis) is a Latin word meaning "of springtime".

== Distribution and habitat ==
Pterostylis vernalis usually grows in open sites in shallow, sandy soil near the edges of sandstone slabs, often with mosses and other small plants. Only five populations are known, all in the Nowra district.

== Conservation ==
Pterostylis vernalis is listed as "critically endangered" (CR) under the Environment Protection and Biodiversity Conservation Act 1999 (EPBC Act) and under the New South Wales Government NSW Threatened Species Conservation Act. Only about 500 mature plants are known from five separate populations, only one of which is in a national park. The main threat to the species is land clearing.
