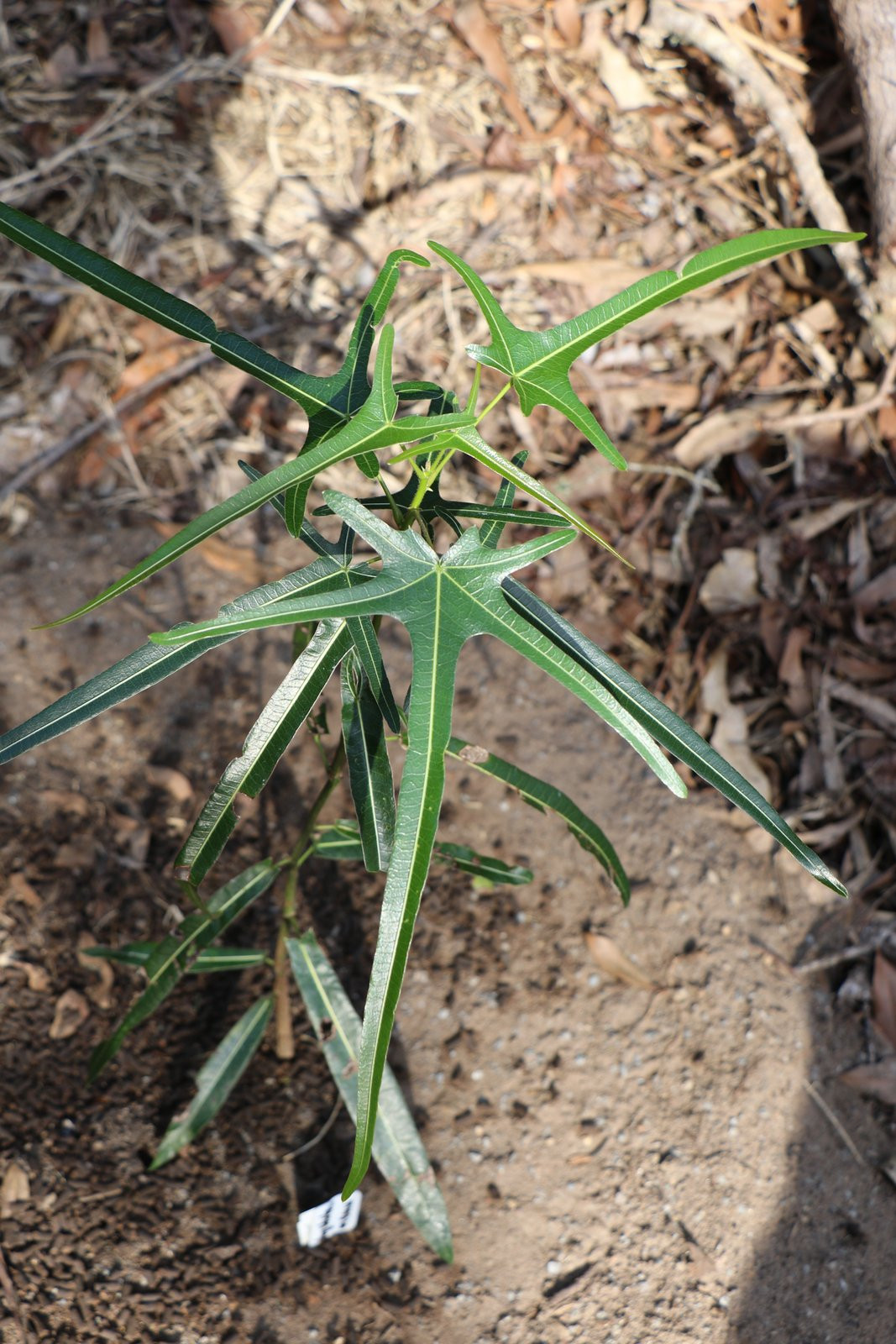
- Ormeau bottle tree, juvenile

Conservation status
- Critically endangered (EPBC Act)

Scientific classification
- Kingdom: Plantae
- Clade: Tracheophytes
- Clade: Angiosperms
- Clade: Eudicots
- Clade: Rosids
- Order: Malvales
- Family: Malvaceae
- Subfamily: Sterculioideae
- Genus: Brachychiton
- Species: B. sp. Ormeau

Binomial name
- Brachychiton sp. Ormeau

= Brachychiton sp. Ormeau =

Species of tree

Brachychiton sp. Ormeau is a rare and endangered rainforest tree found in Queensland, Australia.

== Description ==
A species of tree belonging to the genus Brachychiton, it reaches up to 25 metres in height. The leaves are dropped during the dry season, a time of year the species favours for reproduction, and return as pale to coppery coloured new growth. The flowering period is during September, the profuse display of green to white bell-shaped flowers appearing at the terminus of the branches; the width of each flower is around 10 mm. Fruiting pods appear from January to February, these are 3 cm long, brown, and boat-shaped. During the later stages of growth the trunk begins to form an exaggerated bottle shape, and the leaves alter from a deeply lobed shape, divided from five to nine times, to a glossy and often elliptical leaf 12 to 20 cm long.

The tree is capable of attaining a great age, over 120 years being possible. Sexual maturity is reached after around twenty years.

== Distribution and range ==
The Ormeau bottle trees are noticeably restricted in range, extending over a range of only 6.5 km^{2} and occurring in very low population densities. The largest stand, regarded as the most viable population, is reported to consist of 131 plants. Another two reproductive populations have been found in separate locations nearby but each contains fewer than ten trees; other individuals occur as non-seeding outliers within this total population of 161 trees.

== Conservation ==
The main population occurs within an 'environmental park', the Wongawallan Conservation Area in the rural suburb of Wongawallan, Queensland, where it is afforded some protection from threatening factors. The small groups outside this area are located on a lease for proposed quarries. The federal government has named this tree as one of thirty plant species to be given the highest priority for protection from extinction, and that its status be improved by the year 2020. The major threats identified are habitat loss, fire, insect and weed infestation and the low genetic diversity of those populations that remain.
