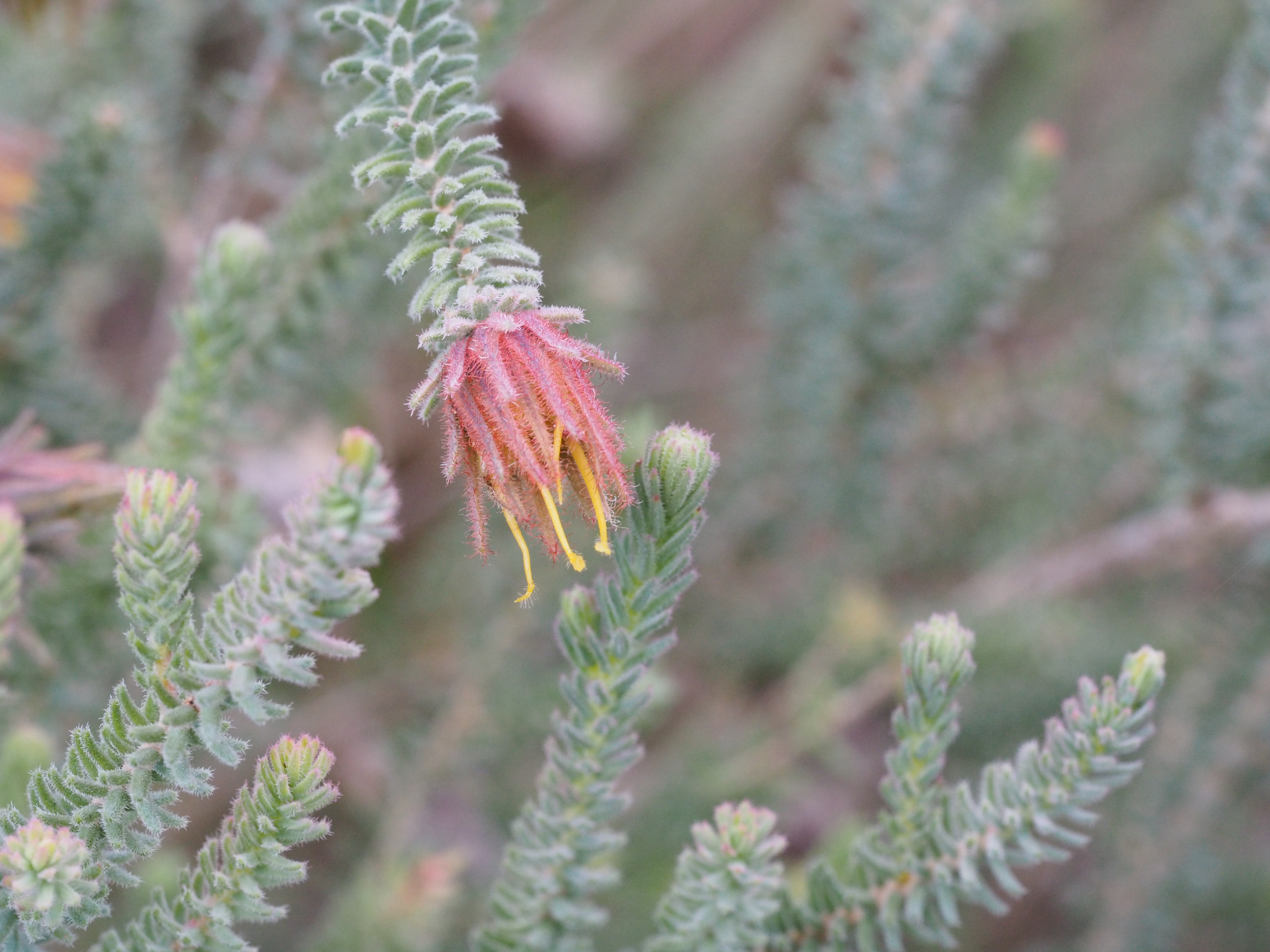
- D. chapmaniana leaves and inflorescence

Conservation status
- Endangered (EPBC Act)

Scientific classification
- Kingdom: Plantae
- Clade: Tracheophytes
- Clade: Angiosperms
- Clade: Eudicots
- Clade: Rosids
- Order: Myrtales
- Family: Myrtaceae
- Genus: Darwinia
- Species: D. carnea

Binomial name
- Darwinia carnea Keighery
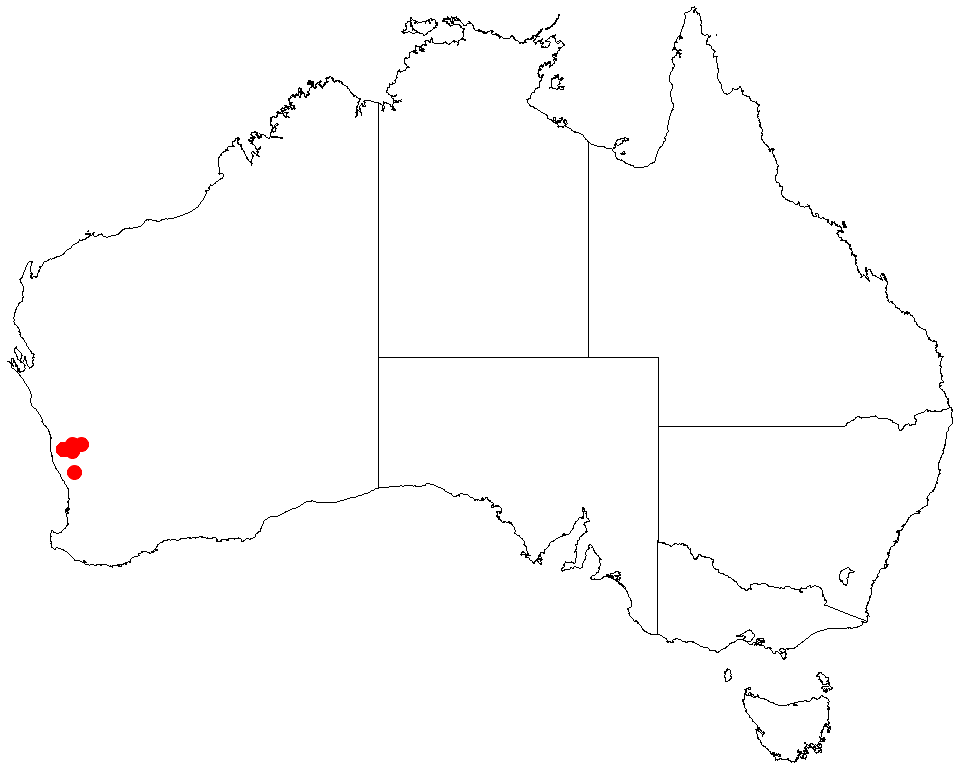
- Occurrence data from AVH

= Darwinia chapmaniana =

Chapman's bell

Species of flowering plant

Darwinia chapmaniana, commonly known as Chapman's bell or Eganu bell, is a plant in the myrtle family Myrtaceae, and is endemic to the south-west of Western Australia. It is a low, rounded, spreading shrub with greyish, hairy leaves and flowers in heads of about 14 small, tubular flowers. The heads are surrounded by long, reddish-yellow, hairy bracts.

== Description ==
Darwinia chapmaniana is a rounded, densely branched shrub which grows to a height of about 0.3 metres (1 ft) and spreads up to 3 metres (10 ft). Its leaves and inflorescences have a distinct curry scent. The leaves are crowded near the ends of the branches, greyish-green in colour, linear in shape, triangular in cross-section and covered with short hairs.

The flowers are arranged in heads of 12 to 16 flowers, the heads about 9–15 centimetres (4–6 in) in diameter on the ends of the branches. The heads are surrounded by layers of bracts, the longest ones reddish-yellow, 4–7 millimetres (0.2–0.3 in) long with long reddish-yellow hairs on their edges. Individual flowers are yellowish in colour, tubular in shape, about 3–4 millimetres (0.1–0.2 in) long with the stamens, staminodes and the base of the style enclosed by the petals. The style is 8–10 millimetres (0.3–0.4 in) long, curved and yellowish red, extends beyond the petals and bracts and has a band of hairs near its tip. Flowering occurs between September and November, mainly in October, and is followed by fruit which is a small, non-fleshy nut containing one or two seeds.

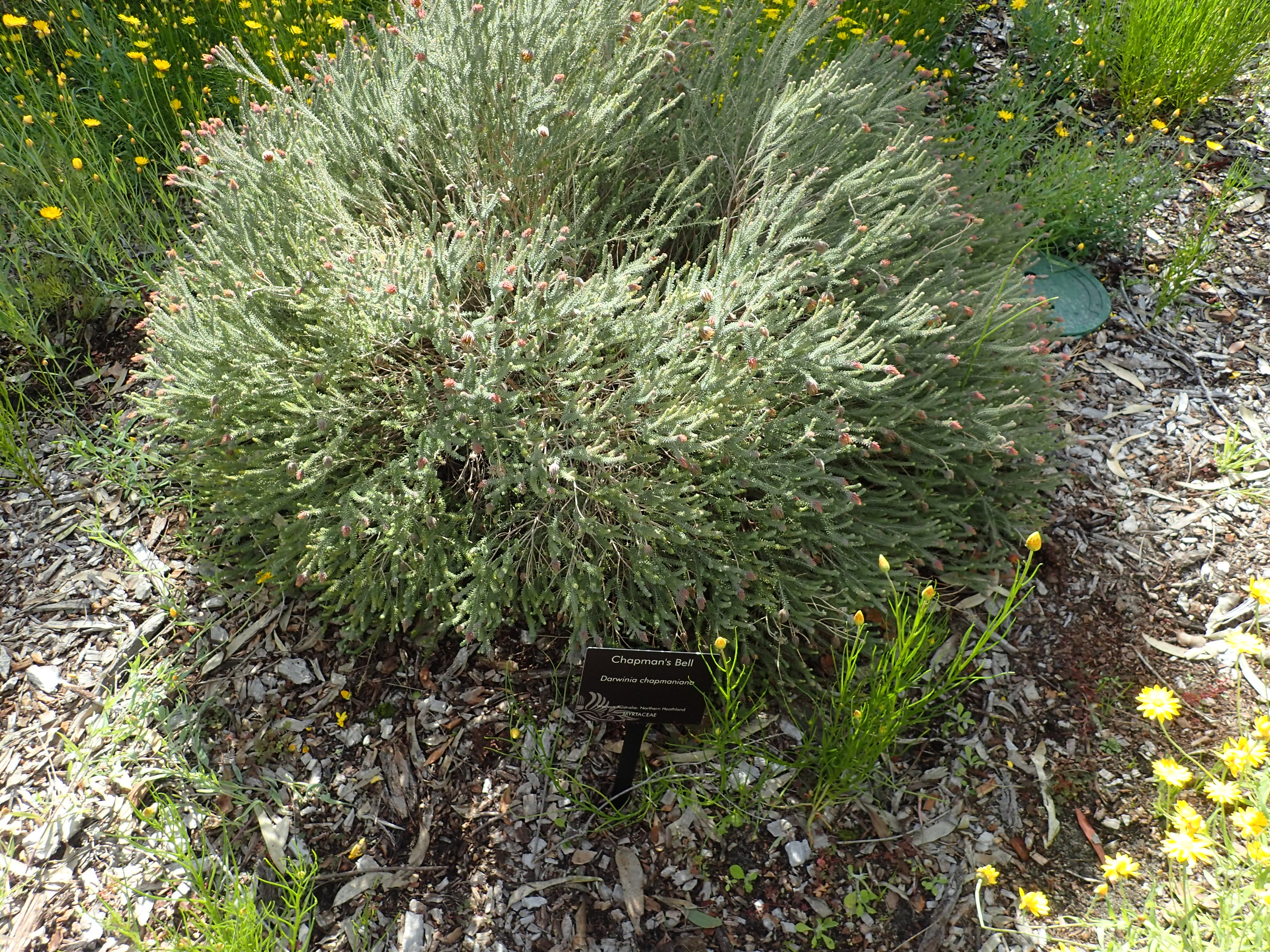
D. chapmaniana growing in Kings Park, Perth

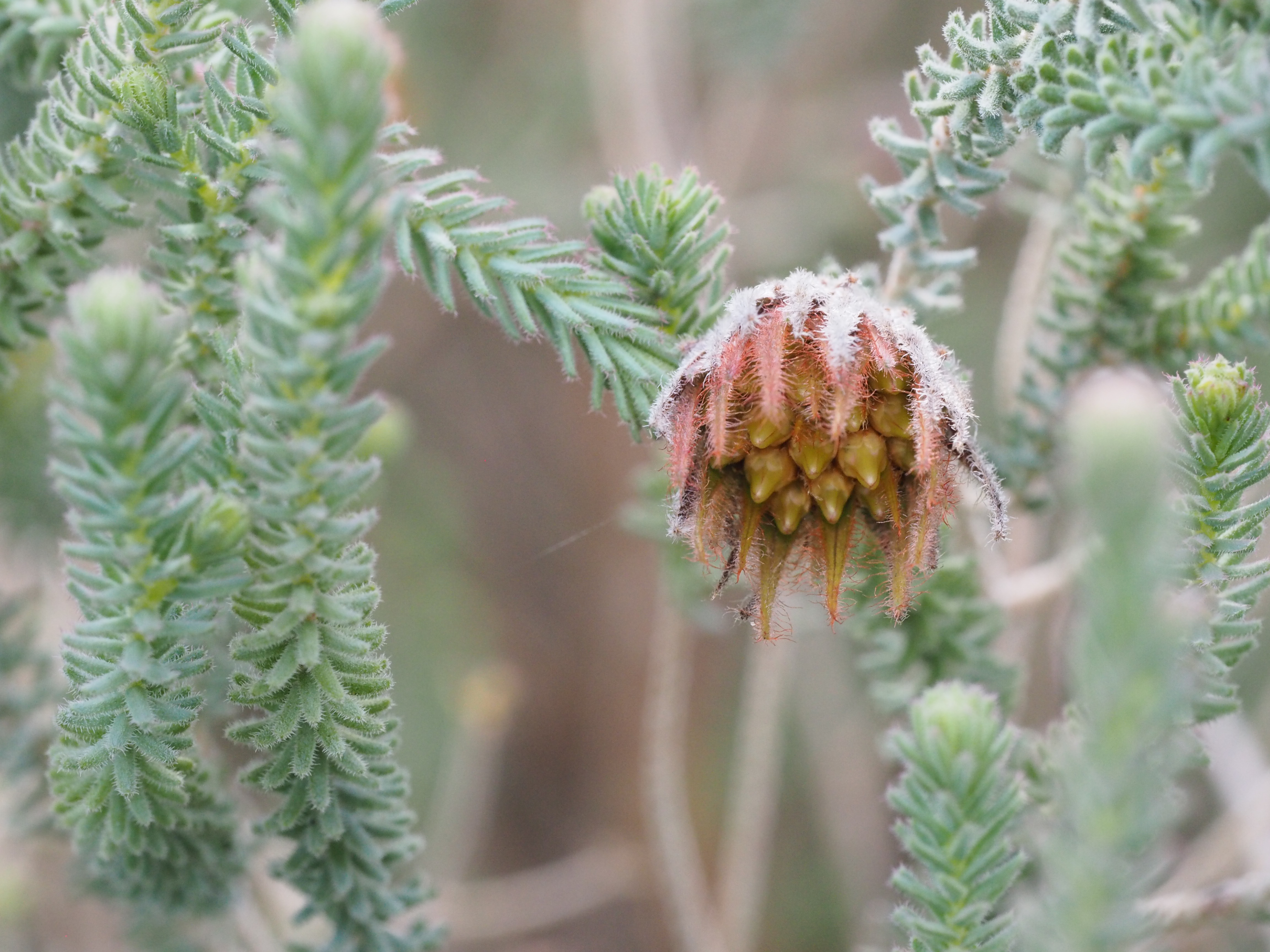
D. chapmaniana flower detail

== Taxonomy ==
The first formal description of D. chapmaniana was published by Greg Keighery in 2009 in Nuytsia. He collected the type specimen near Coorow. The specific epithet (chapmaniana) honours Charles Chapman, a farmer and who collected the first specimens of this species.

== Distribution and habitat ==
This darwinia is only known to occur in a small area near Coorow where it grows around salt lakes in woodland or shrubland.

== Conservation ==
Darwinia chapmaniana is classified as "Threatened Flora (Declared Rare Flora — Extant)" by the Western Australian Government Department of Parks and Wildlife. It has also been listed as "Endangered" (EN) under the Australian Government Environment Protection and Biodiversity Conservation Act 1999 (EPBC Act). The threats to its survival include land clearing, soil salination, weed invasion and grazing.
