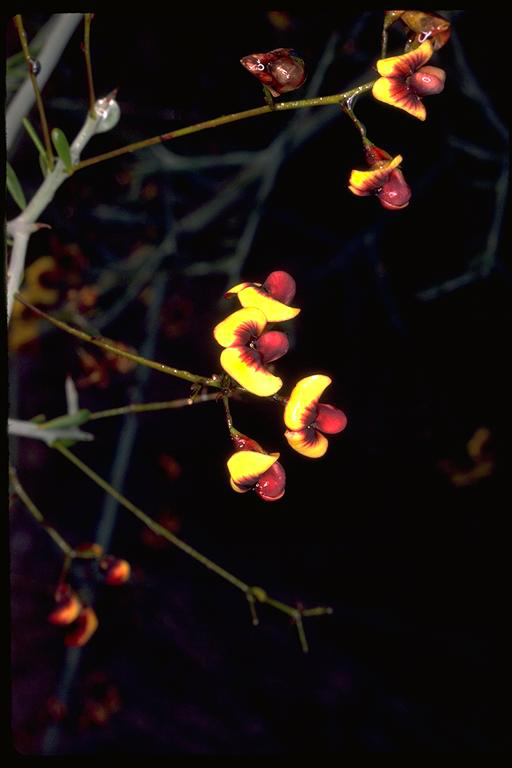

Conservation status
- Endangered (EPBC Act)

Scientific classification
- Kingdom: Plantae
- Clade: Tracheophytes
- Clade: Angiosperms
- Clade: Eudicots
- Clade: Rosids
- Order: Fabales
- Family: Fabaceae
- Subfamily: Faboideae
- Genus: Daviesia
- Species: D. bursarioides

Binomial name
- Daviesia bursarioides Crisp

= Daviesia bursarioides =

Three Springs daviesia

Species of flowering plant

Daviesia bursarioides, commonly known as Three Springs daviesia, is a species of flowering plant in the family Fabaceae and is endemic to a restricted part of the south-west of Western Australia. It is a straggling shrub with widely-spreading, spiny branches, scattered, flattened phyllodes, and yellow, deep pink and maroon flowers.

== Description ==
Daviesia bursarioides is a straggling shrub that typically grows up to 2 m (6 ft 7 in) with widely-spreading, spiny branchlets. Its leaves are reduced to scattered, flattened, narrowly egg-shaped phyllodes with the narrower end towards the base, 3–20 mm (0.12–0.79 in) long and 0.75–2.5 mm (0.030–0.098 in) wide. The flowers are arranged in groups of three to eight in leaf axils on a peduncle 18–35 mm (0.71–1.38 in) long, each flower on a pedicel 3–5 mm (0.12–0.20 in) long with linear bracts about 1.5 mm (0.059 in) long at the base. The sepals are about 4 mm (0.16 in) long and joined at the base with lobes about 0.5 mm (0.020 in) long. The standard petal is turned back, yellow with a maroon centre, 7.5–10 mm (0.30–0.39 in) long and 9–10 mm (0.35–0.39 in) wide with a notched tip. The wings are deep pink and 6.5–7 mm (0.26–0.28 in) long and the keel is maroon and 5.5–6.5 mm (0.22–0.26 in) long. Flowering occurs from June to September and the fruit is a flattened triangular pod 10–14 mm (0.39–0.55 in) long.

== Taxonomy and naming ==
Daviesia bursarioides was first formally described in 1995 by Michael Crisp in Australian Systematic Botany from specimens he collected near Three Springs in 1980. The specific epithet (bursarioides) means "Bursaria-like".

== Distribution and habitat ==
This species of pea grows in undulating mallee shrubland around Three Springs in the Avon Wheatbelt biogeographic region of south-western Western Australia.

== Conservation status ==
Daviesia bursarioides is classified as "endangered" under the Australian Government Environment Protection and Biodiversity Conservation Act 1999 and a recovery plan has been prepared. The species is also listed as "Threatened Flora (Declared Rare Flora — Extant)" by the Department of Biodiversity, Conservation and Attractions. The main threats to the species include inappropriate maintenance of roads, fences and firebreaks.
