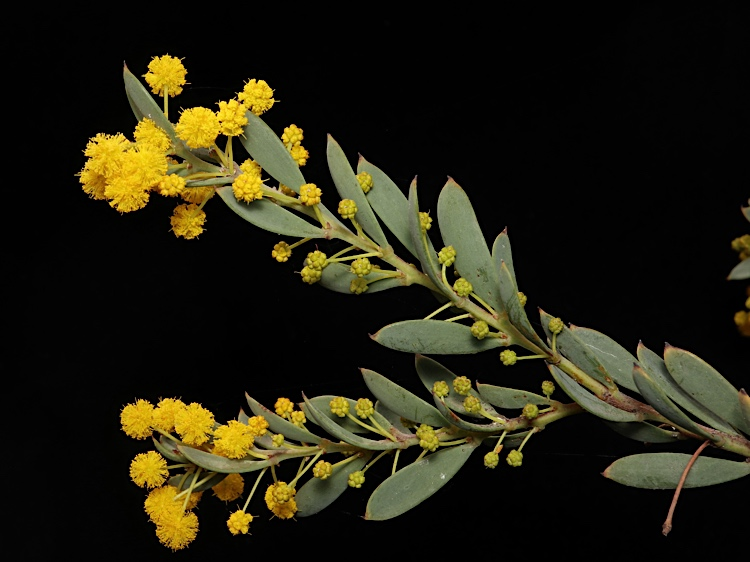
- In the Australian National Botanic Gardens

Conservation status
- Endangered (EPBC Act)

Scientific classification
- Kingdom: Plantae
- Clade: Embryophytes
- Clade: Tracheophytes
- Clade: Spermatophytes
- Clade: Angiosperms
- Clade: Eudicots
- Clade: Rosids
- Order: Fabales
- Family: Fabaceae
- Subfamily: Caesalpinioideae
- Clade: Mimosoid clade
- Genus: Acacia
- Species: A. whibleyana

Binomial name
- Acacia whibleyana R.S.Cowan & Maslin
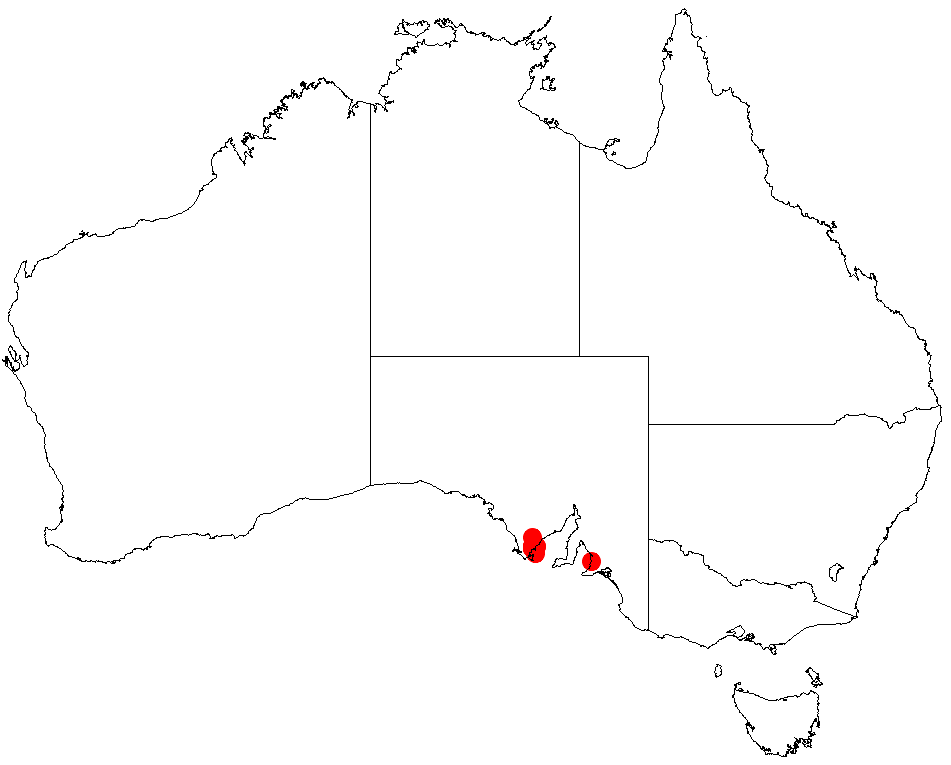
- Occurrence data from AVH

= Acacia whibleyana =

Whibley wattle

Species of legume

Acacia whibleyana (common name - Whibley wattle, Whibley's wattle) is a shrub belonging to the genus Acacia, section Plurinerves. It is native to South Australia.

== Description ==
The perennial shrub typically grows to a height of 1 to 2.5 m (3 ft 3 in to 8 ft 2 in) with a width of up to around 4 m (13 ft) and has a dense, spreading habit with smooth branchlets that have prominent raised scarring from the phyllodes that have detached. Like most species of Acacia it has phyllodes rather than true leaves. It blooms between August and October producing simple inflorescences that are grouped in pairs in the axils and have spherical flower-heads with a diameter of 2.5 to 5 mm (0.098 to 0.197 in) containing 18 to 19 golden coloured flowers.

== Distribution and habitat ==
It is found on limestone and loam, sometimes near salt swamps, but only in the near-coastal areas south of Tumby Bay on the Eyre Peninsula, South Australia.

== Taxonomy and naming ==
It was first described by Richard Sumner Cowan and Bruce Maslin in 1995. The species epithet, whibleyana, honours David J.E. Whibley who contributed considerably to the knowledge of South Australian wattles.

== Conservation status ==
It is listed as "Endangered" under the federal EPBC Act.

== See also ==
- List of Acacia species
