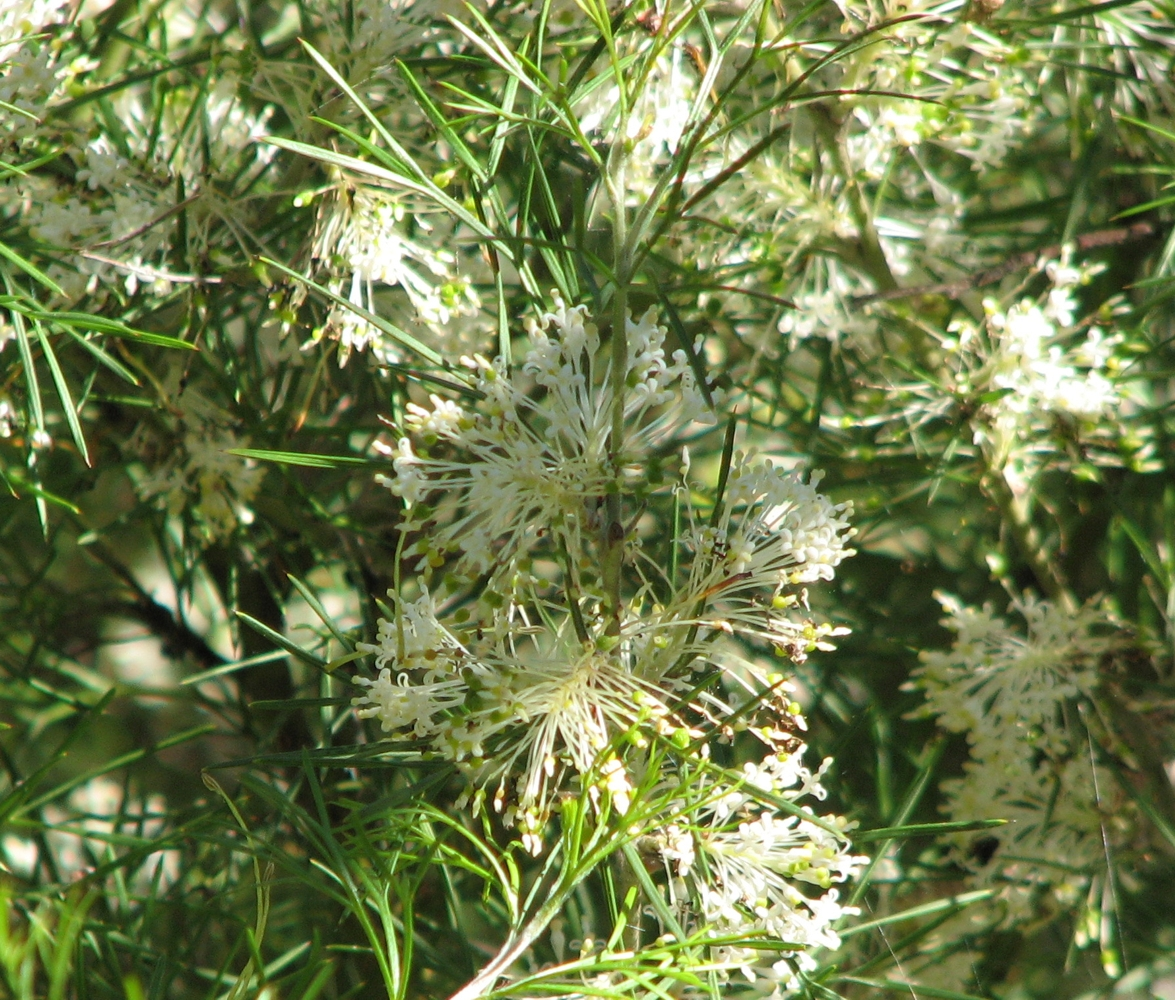
- In Maranoa Gardens

Conservation status
- Endangered (IUCN 3.1)

- Endangered (EPBC Act)

Scientific classification
- Kingdom: Plantae
- Clade: Embryophytes
- Clade: Tracheophytes
- Clade: Spermatophytes
- Clade: Angiosperms
- Clade: Eudicots
- Order: Proteales
- Family: Proteaceae
- Genus: Grevillea
- Species: G. corrugata

Binomial name
- Grevillea corrugata Olde & Marriott

= Grevillea corrugata =

Species of shrub endemic to Western Australia

Grevillea corrugata is a species of flowering plant in the family Proteaceae and is endemic to a restricted area in the south-west of Western Australia. It is a dense shrub with deeply divided leaves usually with three to five sharply-pointed, linear lobes, and white to cream-coloured flowers.

== Description ==
Grevillea corrugata is a dense shrub typically 0.5–2.5 m (1 ft 8 in – 8 ft 2 in) high and 1.5–2 m (4 ft 11 in – 6 ft 7 in) wide. Its leaves are usually deeply divided, 40–60 mm (1.6–2.4 in) long and 90 mm (3.5 in) wide in flattened outline. The leaves have three to five sharply-pointed, linear lobes usually divided again, the ultimate lobes 15–35 mm (0.59–1.38 in) long and 0.7–0.8 mm (0.028–0.031 in) wide. The flowers are white to cream-coloured and arranged in more or less sessile, spherical to oval groups on a rachis 8–20 mm (0.31–0.79 in) long, the pistil 3.5–4.0 mm (0.14–0.16 in) long. Flowering has been observed in August and September and the fruit is a wrinkled, oblong follicle 7–11 mm (0.28–0.43 in) long.

== Taxonomy ==
Grevillea corrugata was first formally described in 1993 by Peter M. Olde and Neil R. Marriott in the journal Nuytsia from specimens collected by Olde near Bindoon in 1992. The specific epithet (corrugata) means "strongly wrinkled", referring to the surface of the fruit.

== Distribution and habitat ==
This grevillea is only known from the type location where it grows in disturbed eucalypt woodland.

== Conservation status ==
Grevillea corrugata is listed as endangered on the IUCN Red List of Threatened Species, as well as under the Australian Government Environment Protection and Biodiversity Conservation Act 1999 and threatened by the Western Australian Government Department of Parks and Wildlife. It has a small and highly restricted distribution with an estimated extent of occurrence of 394 km^{2} (152 sq mi) and a population of approximately 330 mature individuals. Threats to this species include pollution from chemical spraying, competition with invasive weeds and habitat clearing and fragmentation for agriculture.
