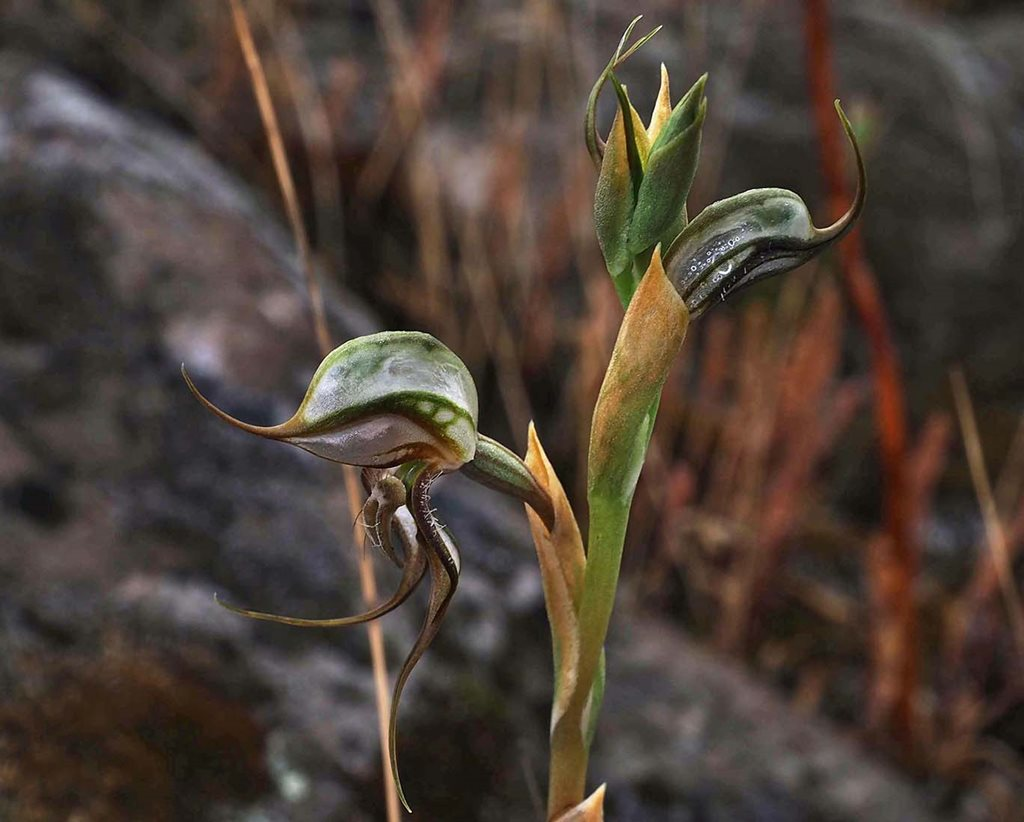
- Pterostylis basaltica growing near Woorndoo

Conservation status
- Endangered (EPBC Act)

Scientific classification
- Kingdom: Plantae
- Clade: Tracheophytes
- Clade: Angiosperms
- Clade: Monocots
- Order: Asparagales
- Family: Orchidaceae
- Subfamily: Orchidoideae
- Tribe: Cranichideae
- Genus: Pterostylis
- Species: P. basaltica

Binomial name
- Pterostylis basaltica D.L.Jones & M.A.Clem.

Synonyms
- Oligochaetochilus basalticus (D.L.Jones & M.A.Clem.) D.L.Jones & M.A.Clem.

= Pterostylis basaltica =

Basalt rustyhood

Species of orchid

Pterostylis basaltica, commonly known as the basalt rustyhood or basalt greenhood is a plant in the orchid family Orchidaceae and is endemic to Victoria. It has a rosette of leaves and eight to fifteen translucent white flowers with green and brown markings and a brownish, insect-like labellum. It is a rare species only known from a small area and is endangered.

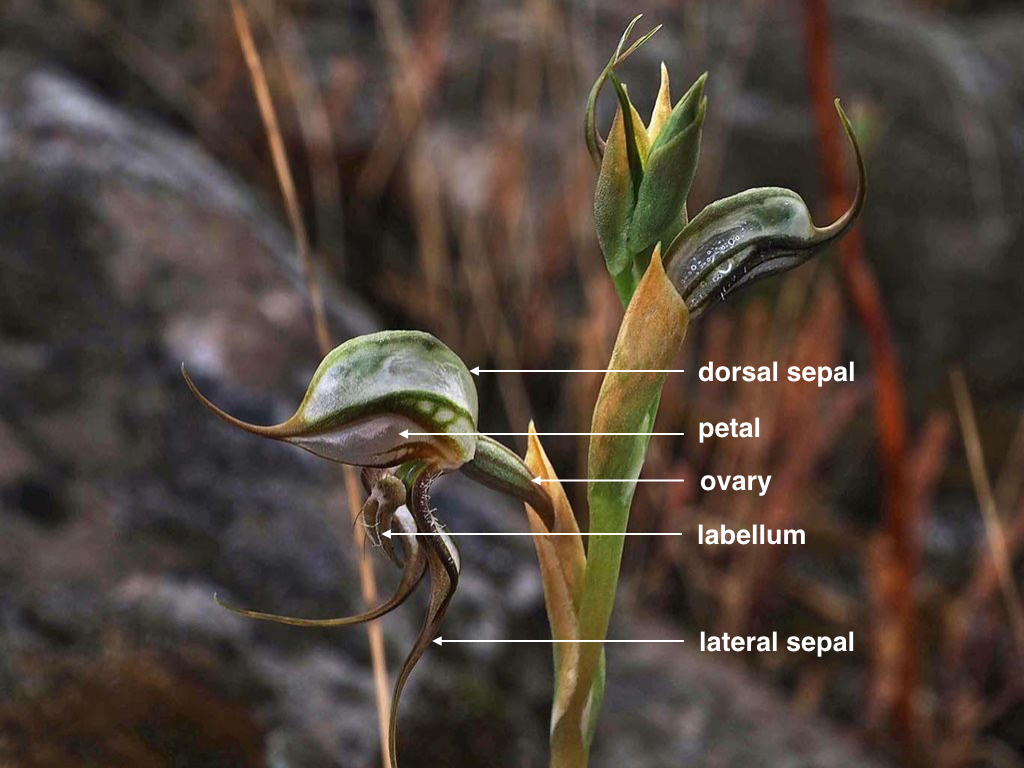
Labelled image of P. basaltica

== Description ==
Pterostylis basaltica, is a terrestrial, perennial, deciduous, herb with an underground tuber. It has a rosette of between eight and fifteen leaves at the base of the flowering spike, each leaf 15–30 mm (0.6–1 in) long and 6–9 mm (0.2–0.4 in) wide. The leaves are egg-shaped and pointed and have usually withered by the time the flowers open. Up to fifteen translucent white flowers with green and brown markings, 30–35 mm (1.2–1.4 in) long and 9–12 mm (0.4–0.5 in) wide are borne on a flowering spike 100–300 mm (4–10 in) tall. Three to five stem leaves are wrapped around the flowering spike. The dorsal sepal and petals form a hood over the column with the dorsal sepal having an upturned point 6–9 mm (0.2–0.4 in) long. The lateral sepals turn downwards, are more or less parallel, joined at their bases and with a few short white hairs. The lateral sepals have thread-like tips 12–15 mm (0.5–0.6 in) long and spreading apart from each other. The labellum is thick, brownish, fleshy, insect-like, about 5 mm (0.2 in) long and 3 mm (0.1 in) wide. There are six to eight pairs of spreading white hairs on the sides of the labellum and four shorter hairs on the swollen "head" end. Flowering occurs from November to December.

== Taxonomy and naming ==
Pterostylis basaltica was first formally described in 1993 by David Jones and Mark Clements from a specimen collected near Woorndoo and the description was published in Muelleria. The specific epithet (basaltica) refers to the basaltic soils in which this species usually grows.

== Distribution and habitat ==
The basalt rustyhood is only known from a single small area near Derrinallum with two populations on western basalt plains grassland in south-western Victoria.

== Conservation ==
One population of P. basaltica occurs on a roadside reserve and has about 1,000 plants and the other, on private property, about 20 plants. None are in a conservation reserve. The main threats to the species are weed invasion, habitat disturbance, altered fire regimes and grazing. The species is classified as "Threatened" by the Victorian Government and as "Endangered" (EN) under the Australian Government Environment Protection and Biodiversity Conservation Act 1999 (EPBC Act) and a recovery plan has been prepared.
