= Pterostylis saxicola =

Sydney plains rustyhood

Conservation status
- Endangered (EPBC Act)

Scientific classification
- Kingdom: Plantae
- Clade: Tracheophytes
- Clade: Angiosperms
- Clade: Monocots
- Order: Asparagales
- Family: Orchidaceae
- Subfamily: Orchidoideae
- Tribe: Cranichideae
- Genus: Pterostylis
- Species: P. saxicola

Binomial name
- Pterostylis saxicola D.L.Jones & M.A.Clem.

Synonyms
- Oligochaetochilus saxicola (D.L.Jones & M.A.Clem.) D.L.Jones & M.A.Clem.

Species of orchid

Pterostylis saxicola, commonly known as the Sydney plains rustyhood, or Sydney plains greenhood, is a plant in the orchid family Orchidaceae and is endemic to New South Wales. It has a rosette of leaves at its base and up to ten reddish-brown flowers with translucent "windows", relatively wide lateral sepals with short-pointed tips and a dark brown, fleshy, insect-like labellum.

== Description ==
Pterostylis saxicola, is a terrestrial, perennial, deciduous, herb with an underground tuber. It has a rosette of between five and eight egg-shaped leaves 15–45 mm (0.6–2 in) long and 5–15 mm (0.2–0.6 in) wide. Flowering plants have a rosette at the base of the flowering spike but the leaves are usually withered by flowering time. Up to ten reddish-brown flowers with translucent panels and 30–35 mm (1.2–1.4 in) long, 9–11 mm (0.35–0.43 in) wide are borne on a flowering spike 150–350 mm (6–10 in) tall. The flowers lean forward and there are two to four stem leaves with their bases wrapped around the flowering spike. The dorsal sepal and petals form a hood or "galea" over the column with the dorsal sepal having a narrow tip 2–3 mm (0.08–0.1 in) long. The lateral sepals turn downwards, are wider than the galea and taper to narrow tips 4–5 mm (0.16–0.20 in) long and about 10 mm (0.4 in) apart. The labellum is fleshy, dark brown and insect-like, 4–6 mm (0.16–0.24 in) long, about 3 mm (0.1 in) wide with a shallow channel along its mid-line. The "head" end is thick and has a few short hairs and the "body" has three to five longer hairs on each side. Flowering occurs from August to November.

== Taxonomy and naming ==
Pterostylis saxicola was first formally described in 1997 by David Jones and Mark Clements and the description was published in The Orchadian.

== Distribution and habitat ==
The Sydney plains rustyhood grows in small, shallow soil pockets in flat areas on top of sandstone rock shelves or on mossy rocks in gullies. It is only known from five locations in the Sydney regions between Picnic Point and Picton.

== Conservation ==
Pterostylis saxicola is listed as "endangered" under the Australian Government Environment Protection and Biodiversity Conservation Act 1999. The main threats to the species are habitat loss and degradation from development, unrestricted access and grazing, weed invasion and inappropriate fire regimes.
