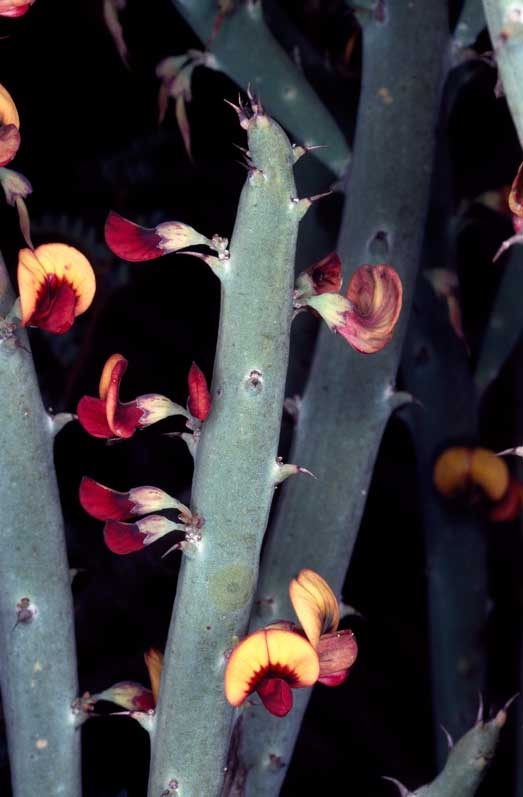
- Daviesia euphorbioides near Wongan Hills

Conservation status
- Declared rare (DEC)

Scientific classification
- Kingdom: Plantae
- Clade: Tracheophytes
- Clade: Angiosperms
- Clade: Eudicots
- Clade: Rosids
- Order: Fabales
- Family: Fabaceae
- Subfamily: Faboideae
- Genus: Daviesia
- Species: D. euphorbioides

Binomial name
- Daviesia euphorbioides Benth.

= Daviesia euphorbioides =

Wongan cactus

Species of flowering plant

Daviesia euphorbioides, commonly known as Wongan cactus, is a species of flowering plant in the family Fabaceae and is endemic to a restricted area in the south-west of Western Australia. It is an open, erect to sprawling, cactus-like shrub with thick, fleshy branchlets and phyllodes reduced to scattered, sharply-pointed spines, and bright yellow, reddish-brown and maroon flowers.

== Description ==
Daviesia euphorbioides is an open, erect to sprawling, cactus-like shrub that typically grows to a height of 40–80 cm (16–31 in) with branchlets that are thick and fleshy, 6–10 mm (0.24–0.39 in) in diameter. Its phyllodes are reduced to scattered, inconspicuous, sharply-pointed spines 0.5–2.5 mm (0.020–0.098 in) long and 1.0–1.5 mm (0.039–0.059 in) wide. The flowers are arranged in single groups of three to six on a peduncle 0.5–1.5 mm (0.020–0.059 in) long, the rachis less than 0.5 mm (0.020 in) long, each flower on a pedicel 1.0–1.5 mm (0.039–0.059 in) long with overlapping bracts up to 0.75 mm (0.030 in) long at the base. The sepals are 3–4 mm (0.12–0.16 in) long and joined at the base, the two upper lobes joined for most of their length and the lower three triangular. The standard petal is broadly egg-shaped with the narrower end towards the base, 7.5–9 mm (0.30–0.35 in) long, 6–8.5 mm (0.24–0.33 in) wide and bright yellow with a reddish-brown base. The wings are 6.5–7.5 mm (0.26–0.30 in) long and maroon, and the keel 6.5–9 mm (0.26–0.35 in) long and maroon. Flowering occurs from July to September and the fruit is a wedge-shaped pod 13–16 mm (0.51–0.63 in) long.

== Taxonomy and naming ==
Daviesia euphorbioides was first formally described in 1864 by George Bentham in Flora Australiensis from specimens collected by James Drummond. The specific epithet (euphorbioides) means "Euphorbia-like".

== Distribution and habitat ==
Wongan cactus grows on flats and sandplains, often in disturbed areas, between Wongan Hills, Dowerin and the Moonijin Nature Reserve in the Avon Wheatbelt biogeographic region of south-western Western Australia.

== Conservation status ==
Daviesia euphorbioides is classed as "Threatened Flora (Declared Rare Flora — Extant)" by the Department of Biodiversity, Conservation and Attractions.
