= Epacris grandis =

Conservation status
- Endangered (EPBC Act)

Scientific classification
- Kingdom: Plantae
- Clade: Tracheophytes
- Clade: Angiosperms
- Clade: Eudicots
- Clade: Asterids
- Order: Ericales
- Family: Ericaceae
- Genus: Epacris
- Species: E. grandis

Binomial name
- Epacris grandis Crowden

Species of flowering plant

Epacris grandis, commonly known as grand heath or tall heath, is a species of flowering plant in the heath family Ericaceae and is endemic to a small area of Tasmania. It is a robust, erect shrub with smooth stems, lance-shaped leaves and tube-shaped flowers with white petals.

== Description ==
Epacris grandis is a robust, erect shrub that typically grows to a height of up to 3 m (9.8 ft) long, has smooth stems and usually a single stem at the base. The leaves are glabrous, lance-shaped, 10–15 mm (0.39–0.59 in) long and 3–4 mm (0.12–0.16 in) wide on a petiole 1–2 mm (0.039–0.079 in) long. The flowers are arranged singly in leaf axils along the branches, each flower on a pedicel about 4 mm (0.16 in) long, with hairy egg-shaped bracts near the base. The sepals are white with pink streaks, lance-shaped, 4–6 mm (0.16–0.24 in) long. The petals are white and joined at the base, forming a bell-shaped tube 4–5 mm (0.16–0.20 in) long with lobes 5–6 mm (0.20–0.24 in) long and 3–4 mm (0.12–0.16 in) wide. The style is about 2 mm (0.079 in) long and is enclosed in the petal tube but the anthers are brown, about 1.5 mm (0.059 in) long and protrude from the petal tube. Flowering occurs from October to March, with a peak in December.

== Taxonomy and naming ==
Epacris grandis was first formally described in 1986 by Ron Crowden in Papers and Proceedings of the Royal Society of Tasmania based on plant material he collected near Bicheno in 1984. The specific epithet (grandis) means "large" or "tall".

== Distribution and habitat ==
This epacris is only known from in and near the Douglas-Apsley National Park in eastern Tasmania where it grows in woodland.

== Conservation status ==
Epacris grandis is classified as "endangered" under the Australian Government Environment Protection and Biodiversity Conservation Act 1999 and the Tasmanian Government Threatened Species Protection Act 1995. The main threats to the species include dieback due to the fungus Phytophthora cinnamomi, inappropriate fire regimes, land clearing and weed invasion. A recovery plan for threatened Tasmanian forest epacrids has been prepared.
