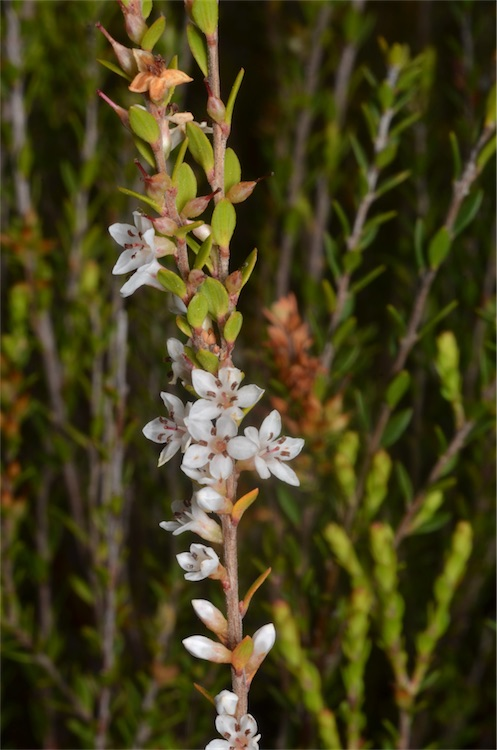
- In the Royal Tasmanian Botanical Gardens

Scientific classification
- Kingdom: Plantae
- Clade: Tracheophytes
- Clade: Angiosperms
- Clade: Eudicots
- Clade: Asterids
- Order: Ericales
- Family: Ericaceae
- Genus: Epacris
- Species: E. virgata

Binomial name
- Epacris virgata Hook.f.

= Epacris virgata =

Species of flowering plant

Epacris virgata is a species of flowering plant in the heath family Ericaceae and is endemic to Tasmania. It was first formally described in 1847 by Joseph Dalton Hooker in the London Journal of Botany.
