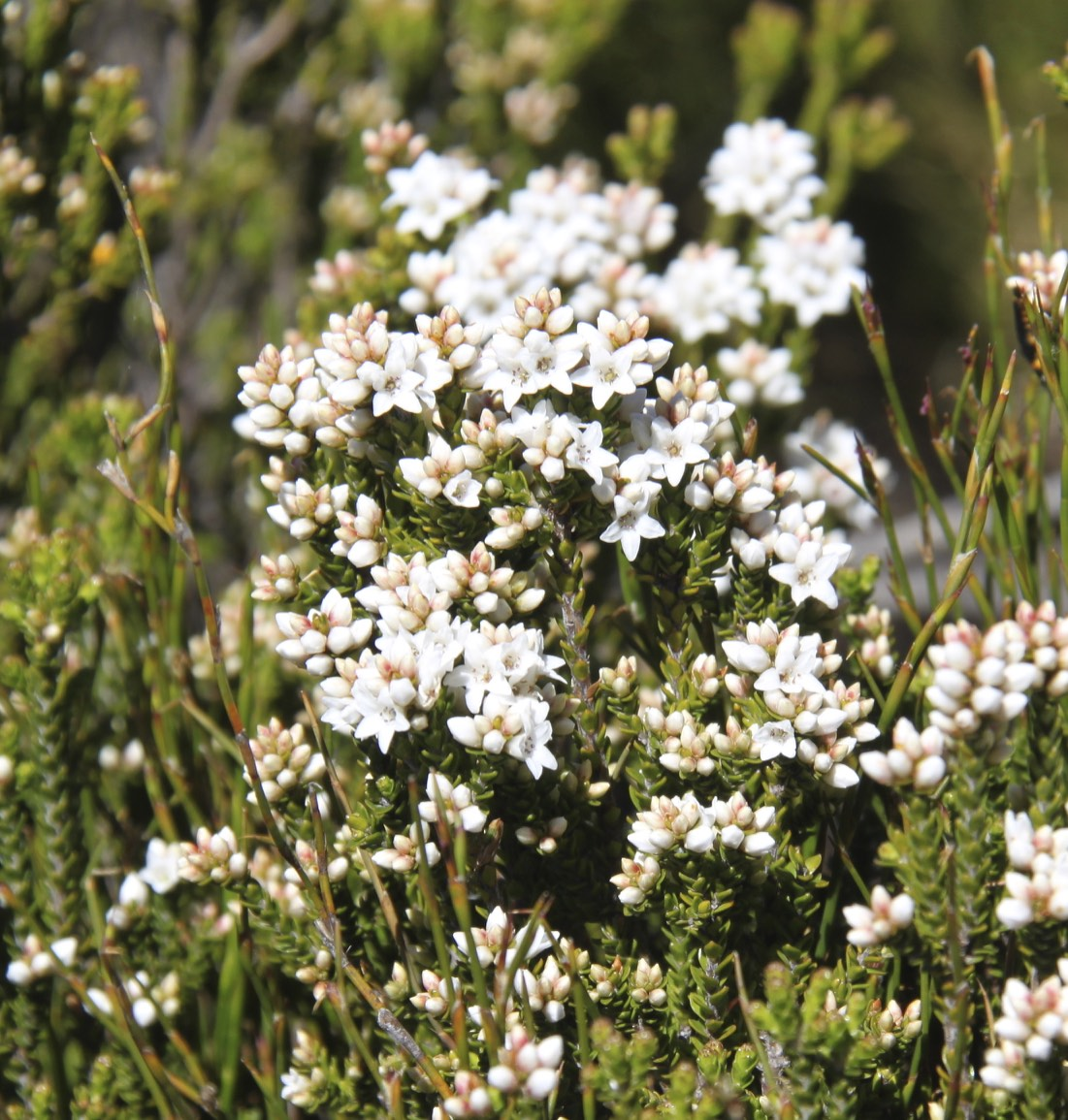
- In Kosciuszko National Park

Scientific classification
- Kingdom: Plantae
- Clade: Tracheophytes
- Clade: Angiosperms
- Clade: Eudicots
- Clade: Asterids
- Order: Ericales
- Family: Ericaceae
- Genus: Epacris
- Species: E. glacialis

Binomial name
- Epacris glacialis (F.Muell.) M.Gray

= Epacris glacialis =

Species of flowering plant

Epacris glacialis, commonly known as reddish bog-heath, is a species of flowering plant in the family Ericaceae and is endemic to south-eastern continental Australia. It is a prostrate to low-lying shrub with crowded, rhombus-shaped to broadly egg-shaped leaves with the narrower end towards the base, and tube-shaped, white flowers in small clusters near the ends of the branches.

== Description ==
Epacris glacialis is a prostrate to low-lying shrub that typically grows to a height of up to 30 cm (12 in), often forms roots on the lower branches and often appear reddish-purple in autumn. The leaves are rhombic to broadly egg-shaped leaves with the narrower end towards the base, 1.8–3.5 mm (0.071–0.138 in) long and 1.5–2.5 mm (0.059–0.098 in) wide on a petiole up to 0.3 mm (0.012 in) long. The flowers are arranged in clusters about 10 mm (0.39 in) long on the ends of branches, the individual flowers more or less sessile with ten to sixteen bracts. The five sepals are 2.8–5 mm (0.11–0.20 in) long and the petals are white, joined to form a bell-shaped tube, 2–3 mm (0.079–0.118 in) long with spreading lobes 2.5–3.5 mm (0.098–0.138 in) long. Flowering occurs from December to February.

== Taxonomy ==
This epacris was first formally described in 1867 by Ferdinand von Mueller who gave it the name Epacris heteronema var. glacialis in Fragmenta Phytographiae Australiae. In 1976, Max Gray raised the variety to species status as Epacris glacialis in Contributions from the Herbarium Australiense. The specific epithet (glacialis) means "frozen" or "glacial".

== Distribution and habitat ==
Epacris glacialis grows in herbfields and grassland near streams and bogs on rocky slopes in the Kosciuszko National Park in New South Wales and the Bogong High Plains in Victoria.
