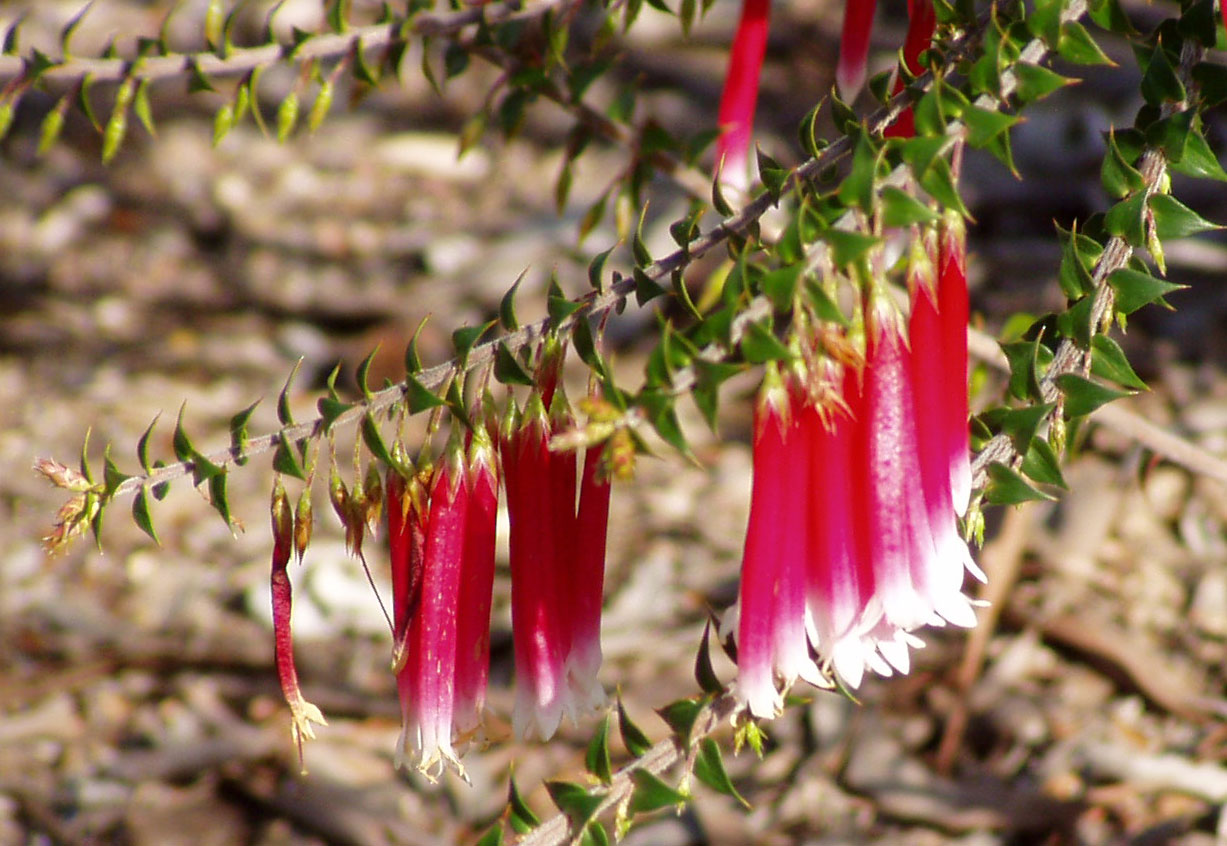
- Epacris longiflora

Scientific classification
- Kingdom: Plantae
- Clade: Embryophytes
- Clade: Tracheophytes
- Clade: Angiosperms
- Clade: Eudicots
- Clade: Asterids
- Order: Ericales
- Family: Ericaceae
- Subfamily: Epacridoideae
- Tribe: Epacrideae
- Genus: Epacris; J.R.Forst.

Species
- See text

= Epacris =

Genus of flowering plants in the heath family

Epacris is a genus of about forty species of flowering plants in the family Ericaceae. It was formerly treated in a closely related but separate family Epacridaceae, but the various genera within Epacridaceae including Epacris have been revised in their relationships to each other and brought under the common umbrella of the Ericaceae. The genus Epacris is native to eastern and southeastern Australia (southeast Queensland south to Tasmania and west to southeast South Australia), and New Zealand. The species are known as heaths or Australian heaths.

== Description ==
Plants in the genus Epacris are shrubs with simple leaves that are a similar colour on both surfaces and with flowers arranged singly in leaf axils near the ends of the branches, sometimes extending along the branches. Each flower is surrounded by many bracts and five, usually glabrous sepals. The petals are joined to produce a cylindrical or bell-like tube with five lobes on the end. There are five stamens which are mostly enclosed in the tube, and a single style which protrudes from the tube. The fruit is a capsule.

== Taxonomy and naming ==
The genus Epacris was first formally described in 1797 by Antonio José Cavanilles, who published the description in Icones et Descriptiones Plantarum. Cavanilles did not specify a type species but in 1983 Edward Groesbeck Voss nominated Epacris longiflora as the lectotype. The genus name (Epacris) is derived from an Ancient Greek word meaning "on the summit", referring to habitat preference.

== Distribution ==
Species of Epacris are found in all Australian states except the Northern Territory and Western Australia. Three further species are found in New Zealand. The New Zealand species E. pauciflora has been reported from New Caledonia, but this report is now regarded as an error.

== Species ==
The following is a list of species recognised by the Australian Plant Census or by the New Zealand Plant Conservation Network as at April 2022:

- Epacris acuminata Benth. (Tas.)
- Epacris alpina Hook.f. (N.Z.)
- Epacris apiculata A.Cunn. (N.S.W.)
- Epacris apsleyensis Crowden (Tas.)
- Epacris barbata Melville – bearded heath (Tas.)
- Epacris breviflora Stapf – drumstick heath (Qld., N.S.W., Vic.)
- Epacris browniae Coleby (N.S.W.)
- Epacris calvertiana F.Muell. (N.S.W.)
- Epacris celata Crowden (N.S.W., Vic.)
- Epacris cerasicollina Crowden (Tas.)
- Epacris coriacea A.Cunn. ex DC. (N.S.W.)
- Epacris corymbiflora Hook.f. (Tas.)
- Epacris crassifolia R.Br. (N.S.W.)
- Epacris curtisiae Jarman (Tas.)
- Epacris decumbens (I.Telford) E.A.Br. (N.S.W.)
- Epacris exserta R.Br. – South Esk heath (Tas.)
- Epacris franklinii Hook.f. (Tas.)
- Epacris glabella Jarman – smooth heath (Tas.)
- Epacris glacialis (F.Muell.) M.Gray (N.S.W., Vic.)
- Epacris gnidioides (Summerh.) E.A.Br. (N.S.W.
- Epacris grandis Crowden (Tas.)
- Epacris graniticola Crowden (Tas.)
- Epacris gunnii Hook.f. – coral heath (N.S.W., Vic., Tas.)
- Epacris hamiltonii Maiden & Betche (N.S.W.)
- Epacris heteronema Labill. (Tas.)
- Epacris impressa Labill. – common or pink heath (Vic., N.S.W., S.A., Tas.)
- Epacris lanuginosa Labill. – woolly-style heath (N.S.W., Vic., Tas.)
- Epacris limbata K.J.Williams & F.Duncan (Tas.)
- Epacris lithophila Crowden & Menadue (N.S.W.)
- Epacris longiflora Cav. – fuchsia heath (Qld., N.S.W.)
- Epacris marginata Melville (Tas.)
- Epacris microphylla R.Br. – coral heath (Qld., N.S.W., Vic.)
- Epacris moscaliana Crowden (Tas.)
- Epacris mucronulata R.Br. (Tas.)
- Epacris muelleri Sond. (N.S.W.)
- Epacris myrtifolia Labill. (Tas.)
- Epacris navicularis Jarman (Tas.)
- Epacris obtusifolia Sm. – blunt-leaf heath (Qld., N.S.W., Vic., Tas.)
- Epacris paludosa R.Br. – swamp heath (N.S.W., A.C.T., Vic., Tas.)
- Epacris pauciflora A.Rich. – tamingi (N.Z.)
- Epacris petrophila Hook.f. – snow heath (N.S.W., A.C.T., Vic., Tas.)
- Epacris pilosa Crowden (N.S.W.)
- Epacris pinoidea Crowden & Menadue (N.S.W.)
- Epacris pulchella Cav. – wallum heath (Qld., N.S.W.)
- Epacris purpurascens Banks ex Sims – Port Jackson heath (N.S.W.)
- Epacris reclinata A.Cunn. ex Benth. (N.S.W.)
- Epacris rhombifolia (L.R.Fraser & Vickery) Menadue (N.S.W., Vic.)
- Epacris rigida Sieber ex Spreng. – keeled heath (N.S.W.)
- Epacris robusta Benth. – round-leaf heath (N.S.W., A.C.T.)
- Epacris serpyllifolia R.Br. – thyme heath (Tas.)
- Epacris sinclairii Hook.f. – Sinclair's tamingi (N.Z.)
- Epacris sparsa R.Br. (N.S.W.)
- Epacris sprengelioides (Maiden & Betche) E.A.Br. (N.S.W.)
- Epacris stuartii Stapf (Tas.)
- Epacris tasmanica W.M.Curtis (Tas.)
- Epacris virgata Hook.f. (Tas.)

== Images ==
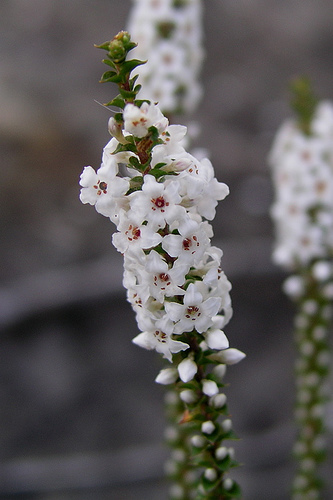
Epacris microphylla

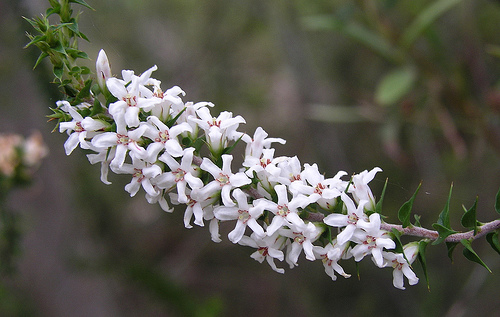
Epacris pulchella

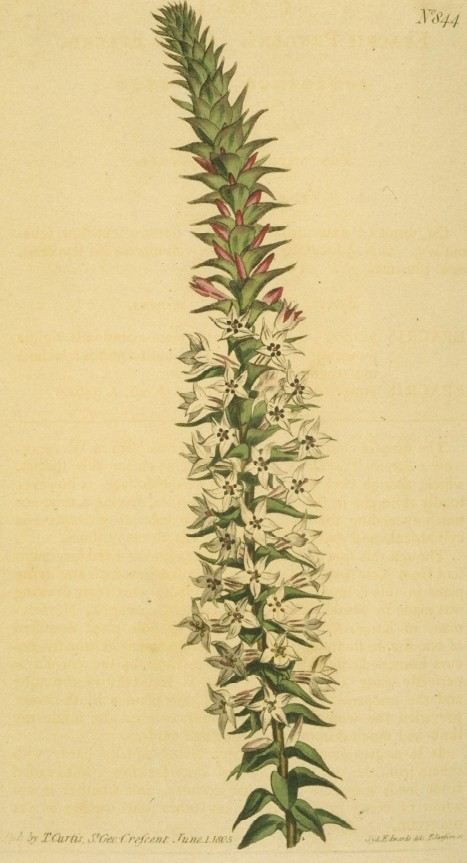
Epacris purpurascens
