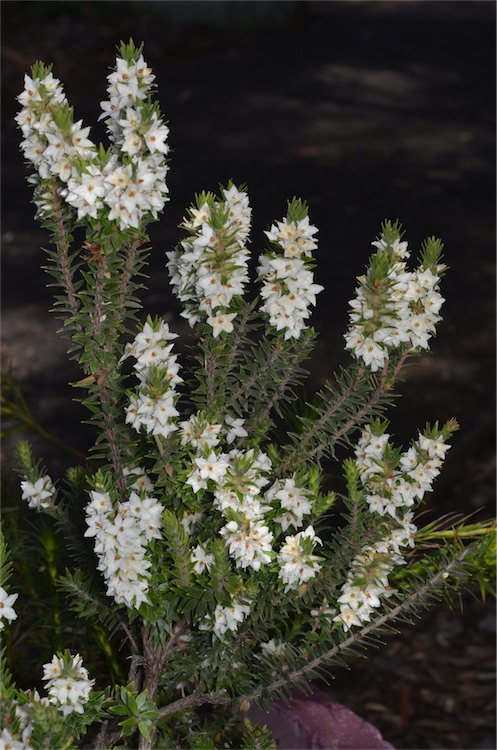
- In the Australian National Botanic Gardens

Scientific classification
- Kingdom: Plantae
- Clade: Tracheophytes
- Clade: Angiosperms
- Clade: Eudicots
- Clade: Asterids
- Order: Ericales
- Family: Ericaceae
- Genus: Epacris
- Species: E. decumbens

Binomial name
- Epacris decumbens (I.Telford) E.A.Br.

Synonyms
- Rupicola decumbens I.Telford; Rupicola sp. 1 (Glen Davis)

= Epacris decumbens =

Species of flowering plant

Epacris decumbens is a species of flowering plant in the heath family Ericaceae and is endemic to a restricted area of New South Wales. It is a straggling, low-lying shrub with hairy branchlets, elliptic to egg-shaped leaves, and tube-shaped, white flowers.

== Description ==
Epacris decumbens is a straggling, low-lying shrub that typically grows to a height of up to 80 cm (31 in) and has shaggy-hairy stems up to 1 m (3 ft 3 in) long. The leaves are elliptic to egg-shaped, 12–20 mm (0.47–0.79 in) long and 3.8–7.6 mm (0.15–0.30 in) wide on a hairy petiole 1–2 mm (0.039–0.079 in) long. The flowers are 13–17 mm (0.51–0.67 in) in diameter and arranged singly on a peduncle about 3 mm (0.12 in) long, the sepals 5.3–6.1 mm (0.21–0.24 in) long. The petal tube is 1.0–1.3 mm (0.039–0.051 in) long, the lobes 7–8 mm (0.28–0.31 in) long. Flowering occurs in November and December and the fruit is a capsule about 4 mm (0.16 in) in diameter.

== Taxonomy ==
This species was first formally described in 1992 by Ian R.H. Telford who gave it the name Rupicola decumbens in the journal Telopea from specimens he collected with Michael Crisp, near Glen Davis in 1976. In 2015, Elizabeth Anne Brown changed the name to Epacris decumbens in Australian Systematic Botany. The specific epithet (decumbens) means "prostrate but with the tips rising upwards", referring to the habit of the plant.

== Distribution and habitat ==
Epacris decumbens grows on sandstone cliffs, ledges and rock crevices in the Glen Davis and Cudgegong River areas of New South Wales.
