= Epacris pilosa =

Scientific classification
- Kingdom: Plantae
- Clade: Tracheophytes
- Clade: Angiosperms
- Clade: Eudicots
- Clade: Asterids
- Order: Ericales
- Family: Ericaceae
- Genus: Epacris
- Species: E. pilosa

Binomial name
- Epacris pilosa Crowden

Synonyms
- Rupicola ciliata I.Telford

Species of flowering plant

Epacris pilosa is a species of flowering plant in the heath family Ericaceae and is endemic to eastern New South Wales. It is low-lying shrub with weeping, shaggy-hairy branchlets, elliptic to more or less egg-shaped leaves and white or cream-coloured tube-shaped flowers.

== Description ==
Epacris pilosa is a low-lying shrub with weeping branches up to 50 cm (20 in) long, the branchlets covered with shaggy hairs. The leaves are elliptic to more or less egg-shaped, 8–14 mm (0.31–0.55 in) long, 3–4 mm (0.12–0.16 in) wide on a petiole 0.81 mm (0.032 in) long and have fine hairs on the edges. The flowers are 6–8 mm (0.24–0.31 in) in diameter, each flower on a peduncle 3–4 mm (0.12–0.16 in) long, with pointed bracts near the base. The sepals are 3.3–5.0 mm (0.13–0.20 in) long, the petals white or cream-coloured and joined at the base, forming a tube about 1.5 mm (0.059 in) long with lobes 4.9–5.8 mm (0.19–0.23 in) long. The style is about 3 mm (0.12 in) long and the anthers are about 2 mm (0.079 in) long. Flowering occurs from October to December and the fruit is a capsule about 2.5 mm (0.098 in) long.

== Taxonomy and naming ==
This species was first formally described in 1992 by Ian Telford who gave it the name Rupicola ciliata in the journal Telopea based on plant material collected near Kurrajong Heights in 1989. In 2015, R.K. Crowden moved R. ciliata to the genus Epacris, but since a different species had already been given the name Epacris ciliata (now known as Lysinema ciliatum), Crowden changed the name Rupicola ciliata to Epacris pilosa in Australian Systematic Botany. The specific epithet (pilosa) refers to the hairy surface of the leaves, "an unusual feature in this genus".

== Distribution and habitat ==
This epacris grows in rock crevices and ledges in the Kurrajong Heights and Bilpin areas and in parts of the Blue Mountains of New South Wales.
