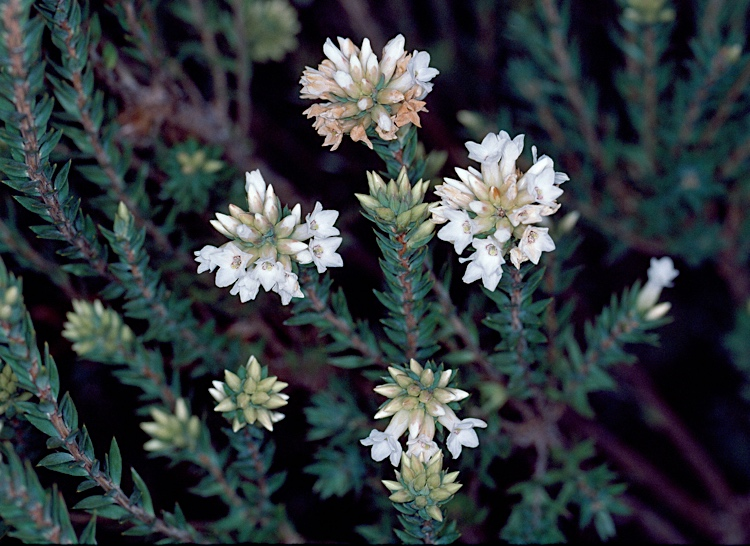
- In the Australian National Botanic Gardens

Scientific classification
- Kingdom: Plantae
- Clade: Tracheophytes
- Clade: Angiosperms
- Clade: Eudicots
- Clade: Asterids
- Order: Ericales
- Family: Ericaceae
- Genus: Epacris
- Species: E. paludosa

Binomial name
- Epacris paludosa R.Br.

= Epacris paludosa =

Species of flowering plant

Epacris paludosa, commonly known as swamp heath, is a species of flowering plant from the heath family, Ericaceae, and is endemic to eastern Australia. It is an erect, bushy shrub with lance-shaped, elliptic or egg-shaped leaves and tube-shaped white or cream-coloured flowers in crowded, leafy heads at the ends of branches.

== Description ==
Epacris paludosa is an erect bushy shrub that typically grows to a height of 0.1–1.6 m (3.9 in – 5 ft 3.0 in) and has hairy branchlets with prominent leaf scars. The leaves are lance-shaped, elliptic or egg-shaped, 5–13 mm (0.20–0.51 in) long and 1.5–3.0 mm (0.059–0.118 in) wide on a petiole about 1 mm (0.039 in) long, the edges with fine teeth. The flowers are arranged in crowded, leafy heads along the upper 60 mm (2.4 in) of the stems, on a peduncle 1.0–1.5 mm (0.039–0.059 in) long with 14 to 22 bracts. The sepals are egg-shaped, 4.0–5.5 mm (0.16–0.22 in) long with a pointed tip, the petals white and joined at the base to form a cylindrical or bell-shaped tube 4–6 mm (0.16–0.24 in) long with lobes 3.0–3.5 mm (0.12–0.14 in) long. Flowering occurs throughout the year with a peak from September to January.

== Taxonomy ==
Epacris paludosa was first formally described in 1810 by Robert Brown in his Prodromus Florae Novae Hollandiae et Insulae Van Diemen. The specific epithet (paludosa) means "boggy" or "marshy".

== Distribution and habitat ==
Swamp heath grows in swampy areas and wet heath south from Sydney and the Blue Mountains in New South Wales, to eastern Victoria and Flinders Island in Tasmania, growing from sea level up to 1,700 m (5,600 ft).

== Ecology ==
In the Sydney region, E. paludosa is associated with such plants as native broom (Viminaria juncea), marsh banksia (Banksia paludosa), and woolly teatree Leptospermum lanigerum. Plants live more than 60 years, and resprout after fire.
