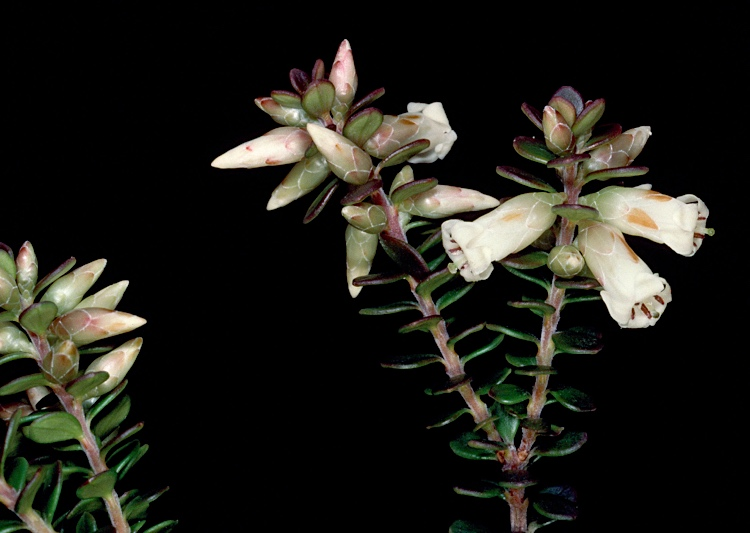
- On the Tinderry Ranges

Scientific classification
- Kingdom: Plantae
- Clade: Tracheophytes
- Clade: Angiosperms
- Clade: Eudicots
- Clade: Asterids
- Order: Ericales
- Family: Ericaceae
- Genus: Epacris
- Species: E. robusta

Binomial name
- Epacris robusta Benth.

= Epacris robusta =

Species of flowering plant

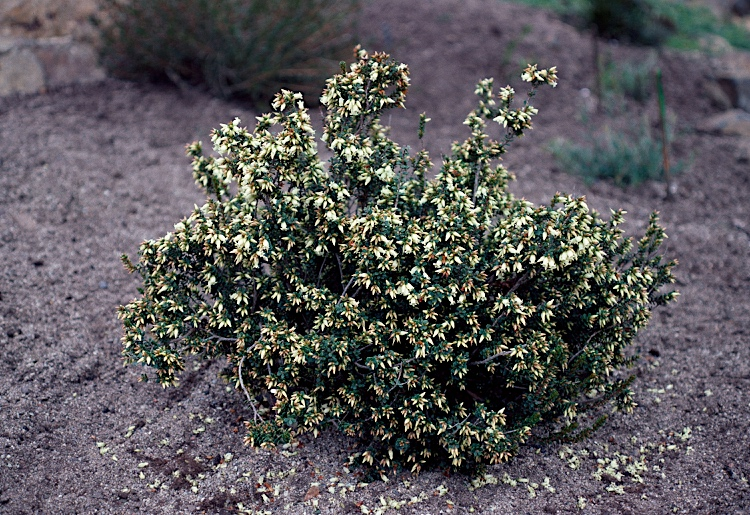
Habit in the Australian National Botanic Gardens

Epacris rigida is a species of flowering plant in the family Ericaceae and is endemic to south-eastern New South Wales. It is an erect to spreading shrub with egg-shaped to more or less circular leaves and sweetly-scented, cream-coloured, tube-shaped flowers.

== Description ==
Epacris robusta is an erect to spreading shrub that typically grows to a height of 0.5–1 m (1 ft 8 in – 3 ft 3 in), its branchlets softly-hairy. Its leaves are egg-shaped with the narrower end towards the base, to more or less rhombic or circular, 4–8 mm (0.16–0.31 in) long and 3.2–6.5 mm (0.13–0.26 in) wide on a petiole 0.7–1.2 mm (0.028–0.047 in) long and curve downwards. The flowers are borne in groups near the ends of branches and are 6–7 mm (0.24–0.28 in) wide, each flower on a peduncle 1–3 mm (0.039–0.118 in) long with bracts and bracteoles at the base. The flowers are sweetly-scented, the sepals 5.2–6.3 mm (0.20–0.25 in) long and the petals cream-coloured, joined at the base to form a tube 6.0–7.6 mm (0.24–0.30 in) long with lobes 2.5–2.9 mm (0.098–0.114 in) long. Flowering mostly occurs from August to December, and the fruit is a capsule about 2.5 mm (0.098 in) long.

== Taxonomy and naming ==
Epacris robusta was first formally described in 1868 by George Bentham in Flora Australiensis from specimens collected by Ferdinand von Mueller near the headwaters of the Genoa River. The specific epithet (robusta) means "hard" or "firm".

== Distribution and habitat ==
This epacris grows in heath or rocky slopes at altitudes above 800 m (2,600 ft) in New South Wales and the Australian Capital Territory, but mainly south of the Tinderry Range.
