= Epacris rigida =

Scientific classification
- Kingdom: Plantae
- Clade: Tracheophytes
- Clade: Angiosperms
- Clade: Eudicots
- Clade: Asterids
- Order: Ericales
- Family: Ericaceae
- Genus: Epacris
- Species: E. rigida

Binomial name
- Epacris rigida Sieber ex DC.

Species of flowering plant

Epacris rigida is a species of flowering plant in the family Ericaceae and is endemic to eastern New South Wales. It is an erect, bushy shrub with elliptic leaves and white or cream-coloured, tube-shaped flowers.

== Description ==
Epacris rigida is an erect, bushy shrub that typically grows to a height of 30–60 cm (12–24 in) and forms a lignotuber. It has softly-hairy branchlets, the stems with conspicuous, more or less triangular leaf scars. The leaves are elliptic, rarely oblong, 2.0–4.9 mm (0.079–0.193 in) long and 1.1–2.8 mm (0.043–0.110 in) wide. The flowers are crowded at the ends of branches and are 4–6 mm (0.16–0.24 in) wide, each flower on a peduncle 1.5–2.0 mm (0.059–0.079 in) long with bracts at the base. The sepals are 2.2–2.7 mm (0.087–0.106 in) long and the petals are white or cream-coloured and joined at the base to form a tube 1.5–2.0 mm (0.059–0.079 in) long with lobes 2–3 mm (0.079–0.118 in) long. The anthers are visible near the end of the petal tube. Flowering usually in August and September, and the fruit is a capsule about 1.5 mm (0.059 in) long.

== Taxonomy and naming ==
Epacris rigida was first formally described in 1827 by Kurt Sprengel in Systema Vegetabilium from an unpublished description by Franz Sieber.

== Distribution and habitat ==
This epacris grows in heath on exposed sandstone ridges in the Blue Mountains.
