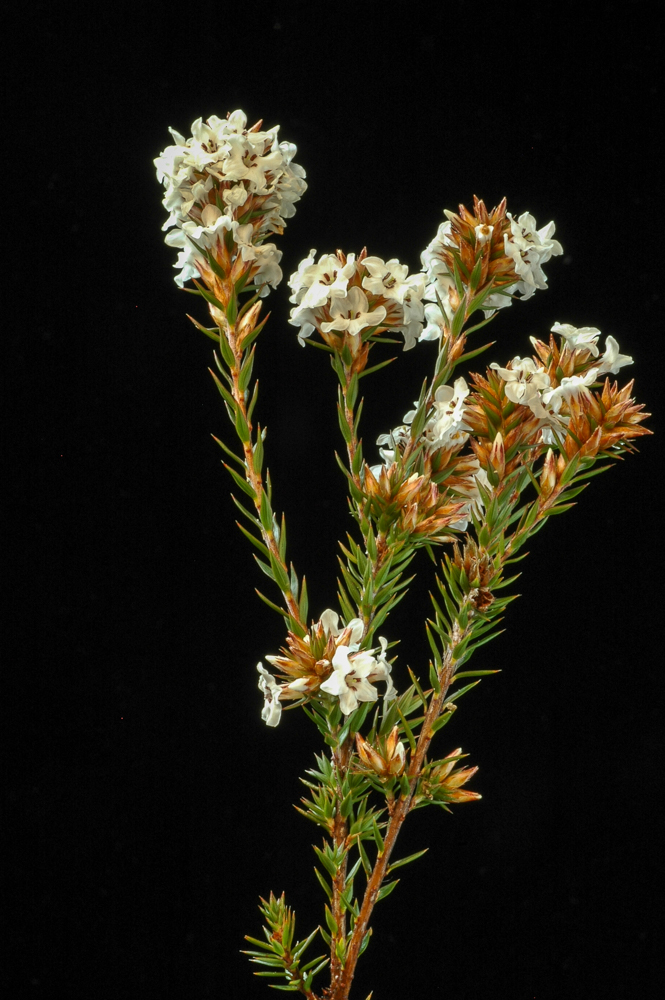

Scientific classification
- Kingdom: Plantae
- Clade: Tracheophytes
- Clade: Angiosperms
- Clade: Eudicots
- Clade: Asterids
- Order: Ericales
- Family: Ericaceae
- Genus: Epacris
- Species: E. lanuginosa

Binomial name
- Epacris lanuginosa Labill.

= Epacris lanuginosa =

Woolly-style heath

Species of flowering plant

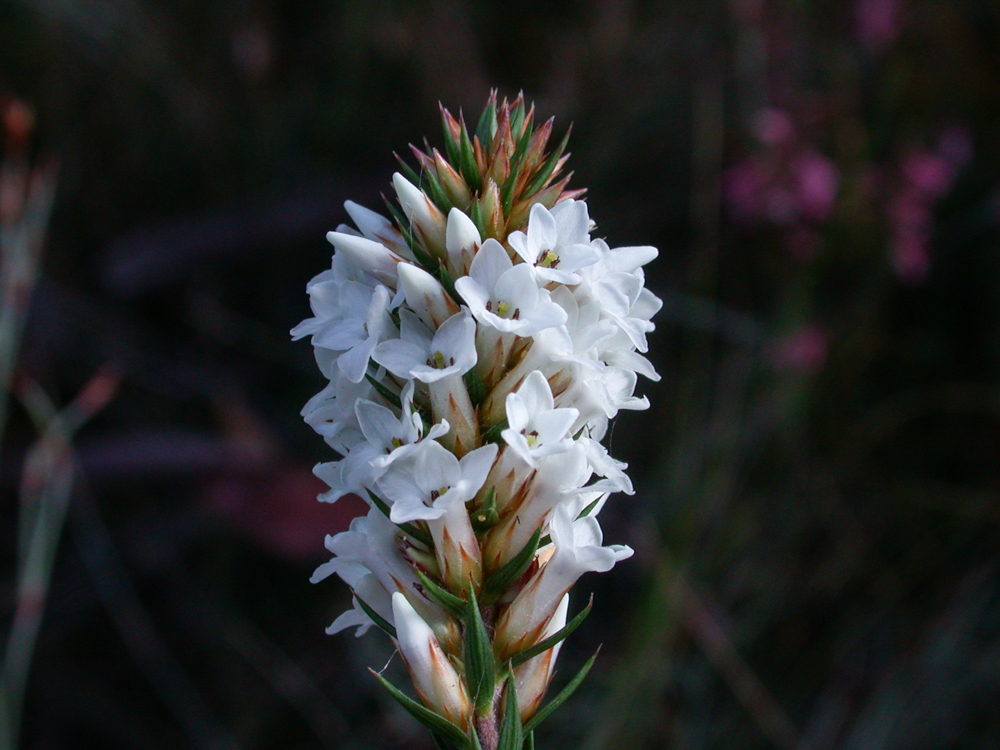
Flower detail

Epacris lanuginosa, commonly known as woolly-style heath, is a species of flowering plant in the family Ericaceae and is endemic to south-eastern Australia. It is a slender, erect shrub with hairy branchlets, linear to lance-shaped leaves, and tube-shaped, white flowers crowded along the ends of the branches.

== Description ==
Epacris lanuginosa is a slender, erect shrub that typically growing to a height of up to about 1.6 m (5 ft 3 in)and has woolly-hairy branchlets. The leaves are crowded, linear to lance-shaped, 5–13 mm (0.20–0.51 in) long, 0.6–3 mm (0.024–0.118 in) wide and sessile or on a petiole up to 1 mm (0.039 in) long. The flowers are arranged on the ends of branches or along the upper 10 cm (3.9 in) of the branches in leaf axils, each flower with up to thirteen to thirty bracts at the base. The sepals are lance-shaped, 4.5–7.5 mm (0.18–0.30 in) long, the petal tube cylindrical to narrowly bell-shaped, 4.5–8 mm (0.18–0.31 in) long with lobes 2.7–4 mm (0.11–0.16 in) long. The anthers are enclosed in the petal tube. Flowering mainly occurs from August to January.

== Taxonomy ==
Epacris lanuginosa was first formally described in 1805 by Jacques Labillardière in his Novae Hollandiae Plantarum Specimen. The specific epithet (lanuginosa) means "abounding in wool".

== Distribution and habitat ==
Woolly-style heath is common in boggy places in Tasmania, but also occurs in wet heath, scrub and forest at low elevations, in southern and western Victoria and the Southern Tablelands of New South Wales.

== Ecology ==
Epacris lanuginosa is susceptible to the exotic fungal rot root disease caused by Phytophthora cinnamomi.
