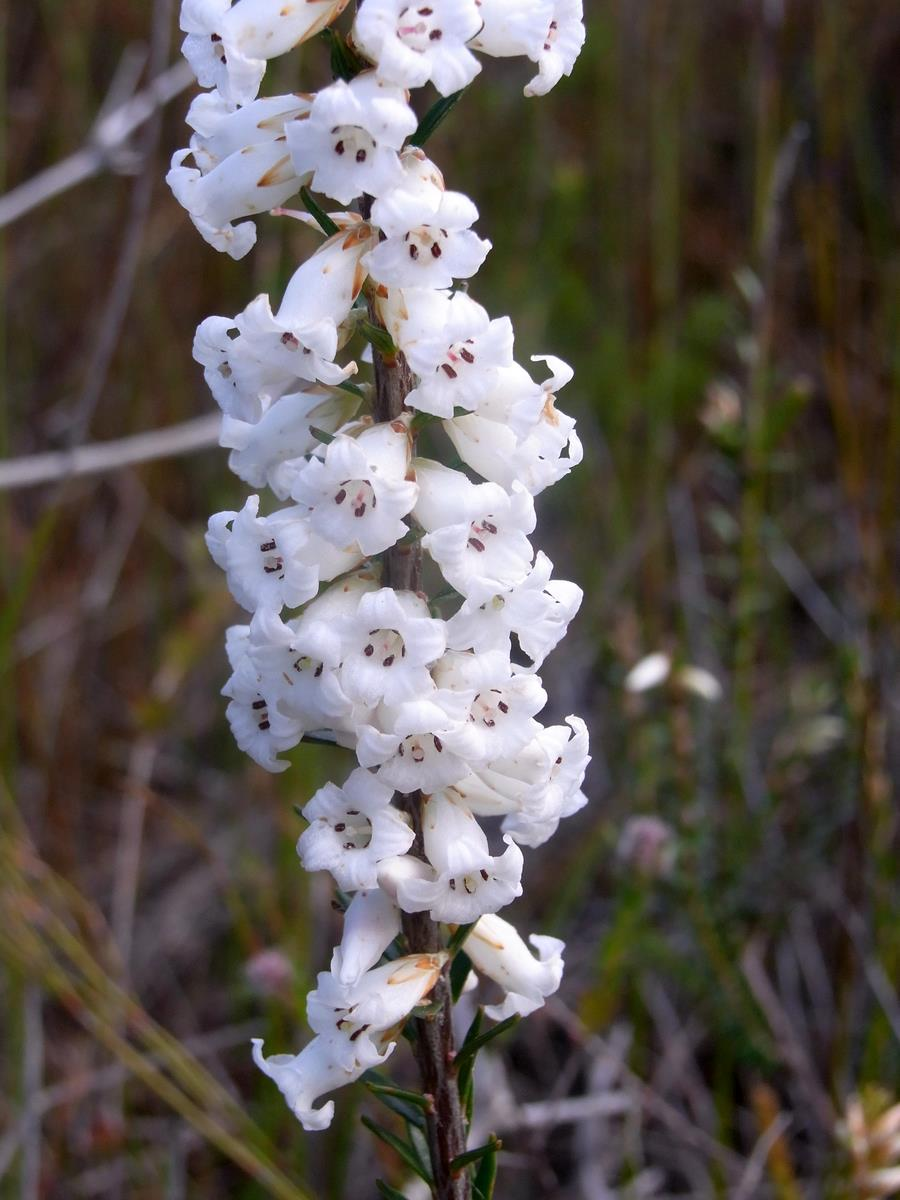
- In Ku-ring-gai Chase National Park

Scientific classification
- Kingdom: Plantae
- Clade: Tracheophytes
- Clade: Angiosperms
- Clade: Eudicots
- Clade: Asterids
- Order: Ericales
- Family: Ericaceae
- Genus: Epacris
- Species: E. obtusifolia

Binomial name
- Epacris obtusifolia Sm.

= Epacris obtusifolia =

Species of flowering plant

Epacris obtusifolia, commonly known as blunt-leaf heath, is a species of flowering plant from the heath family, Ericaceae, and is endemic to eastern Australia. It is an erect shrub with few stems, crowded, oblong to elliptic leaves and tube-shaped white or cream-coloured flowers arranged along the stems.

== Description ==
Epacris obtusifolia is an erect shrub, usually with few stems, that typically grows to a height of 0.5–1.5 m (1 ft 8 in – 4 ft 11 in) and has softly-hairy branchlets. The leaves are oblong to elliptic, 3.5–11 mm (0.14–0.43 in) long and 1.0–3.1 mm (0.039–0.122 in) wide on a petiole 0.5–2 mm (0.020–0.079 in) long, the base wedge-shaped and the tip blunt. The flowers are arranged along up to 150 mm (5.9 in) of the stems, on a peduncle up to 1.5 mm (0.059 in) long. The sepals are 3.9–7 mm (0.15–0.28 in) long, the petals white or cream-coloured, and joined at the base to form a cylindrical or bell-shaped tube 4.8–14.2 mm (0.19–0.56 in) long with lobes 1.6–4 mm (0.063–0.157 in) long. Flowering occurs throughout the year with a peak from July to January.

== Taxonomy ==
Epacris obtusifolia was first formally described in 1804 by James Edward Smith in his Exotic Botany. The specific epithet (obtusifolia) means "blunt-leaved".

== Distribution and habitat ==
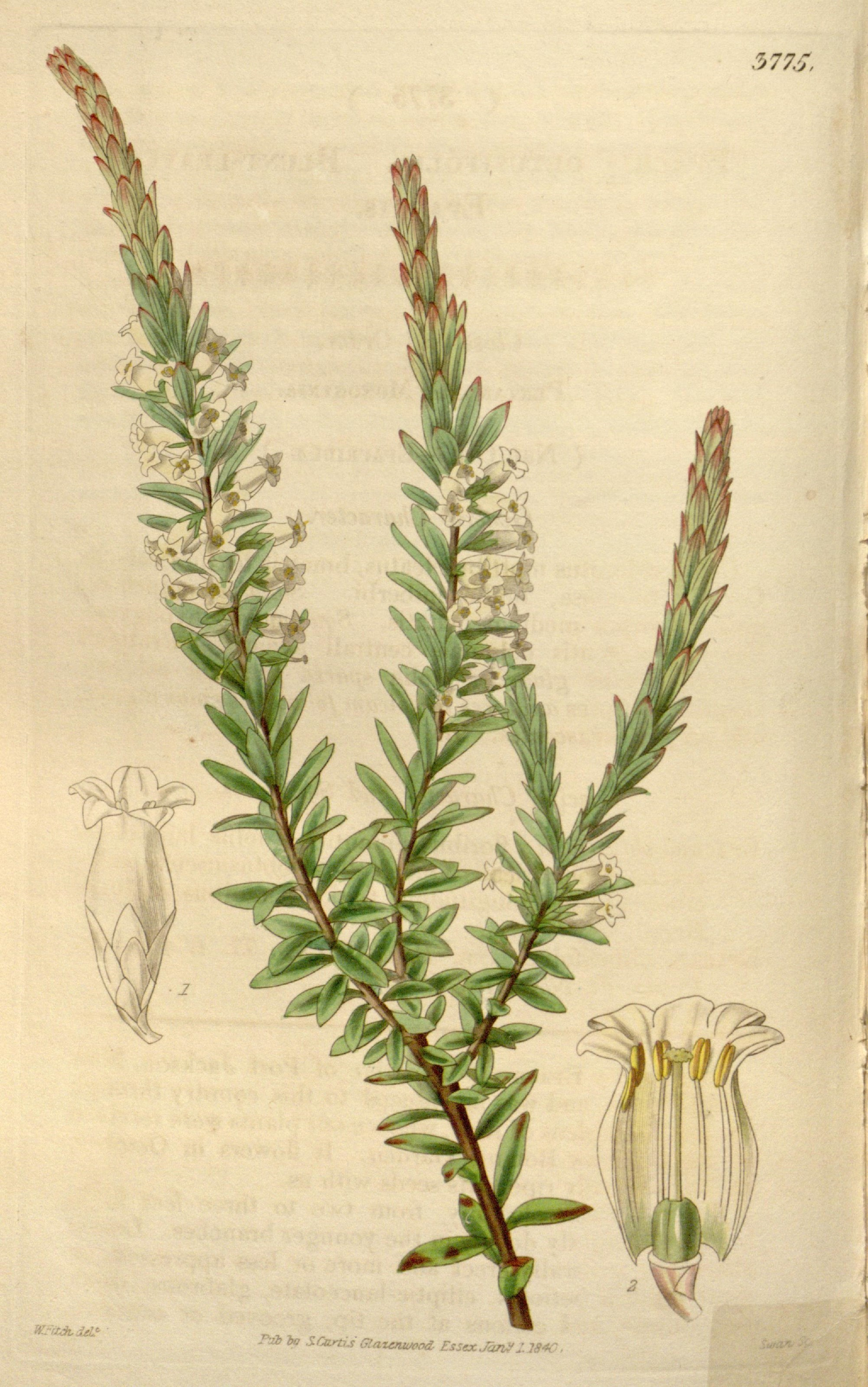
Illustration from 1840

Blunt-leaf heath grows in swampy areas and heathland in eastern Australia. It occurs along the coast and nearby tablelands of south-eastern Queensland and eastern New South Wales, southern Victoria and Tasmania.

== Ecology ==
In the Sydney region, E. obtusifolia is associated with such plants as coral fern (Gleichenia dicarpa), swamp banksia (Banksia robur), and the sedge Lepidosperma limicola. Plants live between ten and twenty years, and are killed by fire and regenerate from seed which lies dormant in the soil. The seedlings reach flowering age within four years.

== Use in horticulture ==
Epacris obtusifolia can be propagated by cutting and requires a well-drained yet moist position in the garden. It was first cultivated in the United Kingdom in 1804.
