= Epacris lithophila =

Scientific classification
- Kingdom: Plantae
- Clade: Tracheophytes
- Clade: Angiosperms
- Clade: Eudicots
- Clade: Asterids
- Order: Ericales
- Family: Ericaceae
- Genus: Epacris
- Species: E. lithophila

Binomial name
- Epacris lithophila Crowden & Menadue

Species of flowering plant

Epacris lithophila is a species of flowering plant in the heath family Ericaceae and is endemic to a small area of New South Wales. It is an erect shrub with few branches, lance-shaped to elliptic leaves and creamy-white, tube-shaped flowers.

== Description ==
Epacris lithophila is an erect shrub that typically grows to a height of up to 30 cm (12 in) and has few branches, the young branches hairy and older branches with obvious leaf scars. The leaves are more or less glabrous, lance-shaped with the narrower end towards the base, to elliptic, 6–14 mm (0.24–0.55 in) long and 2–4 mm (0.079–0.157 in) wide on a petiole about 1 mm (0.039 in) long. The flowers are arranged along the branches, each flower on a pedicel about 2 mm (0.079 in) long, with egg-shaped bracts near the base. The sepals are egg-shaped to elliptic, 3–4 mm (0.12–0.16 in) long. The petals are creamy-white and joined at the base, forming a bell-shaped tube 7–9 mm (0.28–0.35 in) long with lobes 2.0–2.5 mm (0.079–0.098 in) long. The style is 4–6 mm (0.16–0.24 in) long and is enclosed in the petal tube with the anthers. Flowering occurs from November to December.

== Taxonomy and naming ==
Epacris lithophila was first formally described in 1996 by Ron Crowden and Yvonne Menadue in the Annals of Botany based on plant material collected near Lawson in 1975. The specific epithet (lithophila) refers to the rocky habitat of this species.

== Distribution and habitat ==
This epacris grows on sandstone rock or at the base of cliffs in dry forest at higher altitudes in the Blue Mountains of New South Wales.
