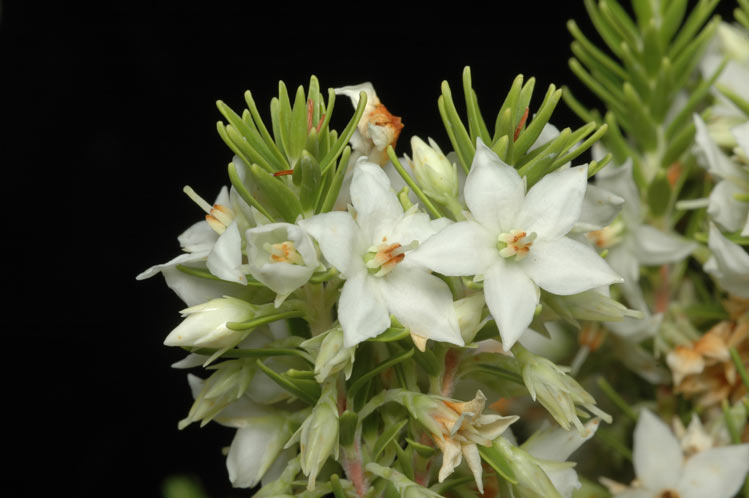
- In the Australian National Botanic Gardens

Scientific classification
- Kingdom: Plantae
- Clade: Tracheophytes
- Clade: Angiosperms
- Clade: Eudicots
- Clade: Asterids
- Order: Ericales
- Family: Ericaceae
- Genus: Epacris
- Species: E. sprengelioides

Binomial name
- Epacris sprengelioides (Maiden & Betche) E.A.Br.

Synonyms
- Rupicola sprengelioides Maiden & Betche

= Epacris sprengelioides =

Species of flowering plant

Epacris sprengelioides is a species of flowering plant in the family Ericaceae and is endemic to a small area in the Blue Mountains in New South Wales. It is an erect shrub with shaggy-hairy branchlets, more or less erect, narrowly elliptic leaves, and white or cream-coloured, tube-shaped flowers.

== Description ==
Epacris sprengelioides is an erect shrub that typically grows to a height of up to 150 cm (59 in), its branchlets covered with shaggy hairs. The leaves are more or less erect, narrowly elliptic, 10–28 mm (0.39–1.10 in) long and 1.8–3.1 mm (0.071–0.122 in) wide on a petiole up to 1 mm (0.039 in) long. The leaves are relatively thin, concave on the upper surface and have a rounded tip. The flowers are white or cream-coloured, 6–9 mm (0.24–0.35 in) in diameter, and are borne on a peduncle 5–10 mm (0.20–0.39 in) long with pointed bracts near the base. The sepals are 2.8–6.6 mm (0.11–0.26 in) long, the petal tube 1.3–2.0 mm (0.051–0.079 in) long with spreading lobes 4.0–6.3 mm (0.16–0.25 in) long. Flowering occurs from September to February and the fruit is a capsule about 1.8 mm (0.071 in) long.

== Taxonomy ==
This species was first formally described in 1899 by Joseph Maiden and Ernst Betche who gave it the name Rupicola sprengelioides in the Proceedings of the Linnean Society of New South Wales, from specimens collected in 1898 at the southern edge of the Kings Tableland in the Blue Mountains. In 2015, Elizabeth Brown changed the name to Epacris sprengelioides in Australian Systematic Botany.

== Distribution and habitat ==
Epacris sprengelioides grows on sandstone ledges, cliff faces and rocky ground in the Burragorang Valley section of the Blue Mountains in eastern New South Wales.
