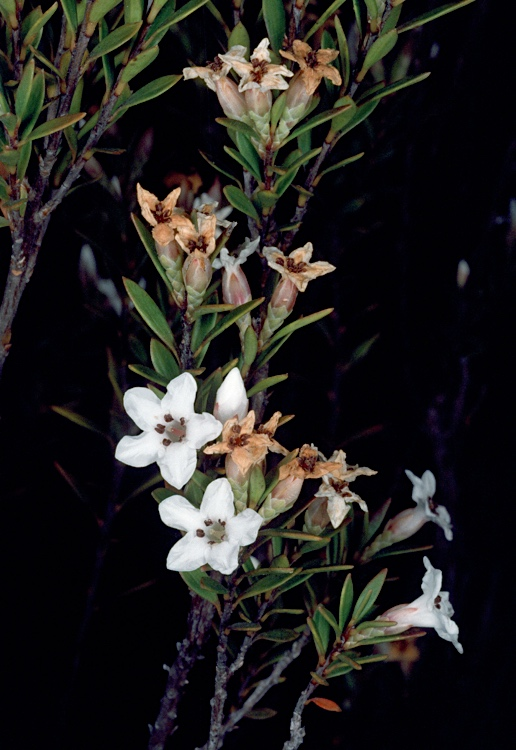
- In the Australian National Botanic Gardens

Scientific classification
- Kingdom: Plantae
- Clade: Tracheophytes
- Clade: Angiosperms
- Clade: Eudicots
- Clade: Asterids
- Order: Ericales
- Family: Ericaceae
- Genus: Epacris
- Species: E. mucronulata

Binomial name
- Epacris mucronulata R.Br.

= Epacris mucronulata =

Species of flowering plant

Epacris mucronulata is a species of flowering plant in the heath family Ericaceae and is endemic to Tasmania. It is an erect shrub with softly-hairy young branches, lance-shaped leaves, and cylindrical white flowers in small groups at the ends of the branches.

== Description ==
Epacris mucronulata is an erect shrub that typically grows to a height of up to 2 m (6 ft 7 in) and has many branches, the young stems softly-hairy. Its leaves are lance-shaped, 8–12 mm (0.31–0.47 in) long and 1.5–2.0 mm (0.059–0.079 in) wide on a petiole 1.0–1.2 mm (0.039–0.047 in) long. The flowers are arranged in small clusters in leaf axils near the ends of branches on a pedicel 2.0–2.3 mm (0.079–0.091 in) long with egg-shaped bracts at the base. The five sepals are lance-shaped to narrowly egg-shaped and about 4 mm (0.16 in) long. The petals are white, joined at the base to form a cylindrical tube, the style and anthers enclosed inside the petal tube.

== Taxonomy and naming ==
Epacris mucronulata was first formally described in 1810 by Robert in his Prodromus Florae Novae Hollandiae et Insulae Van Diemen. The specific epithet (mucronulata) means "having a small sharp point".

== Distribution and habitat ==
This epacris grows near rivers, especially in rainforest and is found in the south-west of Tasmania, including near the Huon and Gordon Rivers.
