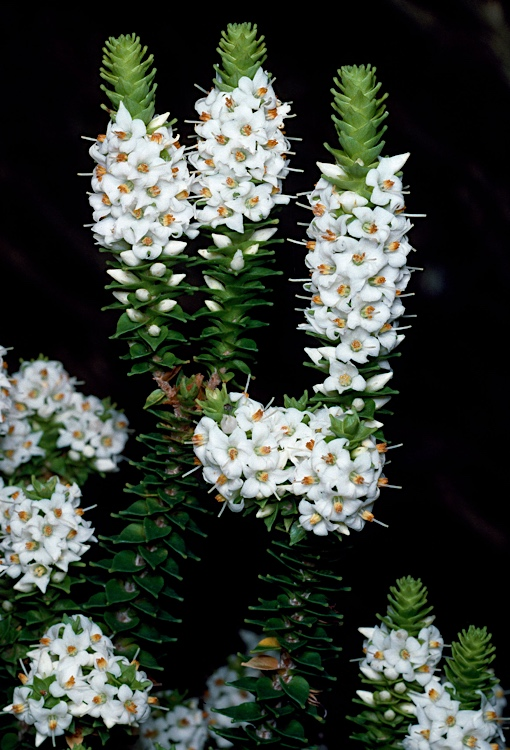
- In the Australian National Botanic Gardens

Scientific classification
- Kingdom: Plantae
- Clade: Tracheophytes
- Clade: Angiosperms
- Clade: Eudicots
- Clade: Asterids
- Order: Ericales
- Family: Ericaceae
- Genus: Epacris
- Species: E. apiculata

Binomial name
- Epacris apiculata R.Br.

Synonyms
- Rupicola apiculata (A.Cunn.) I.Telford

= Epacris apiculata =

Species of flowering plant

Epacris apiculata is a species of flowering plant in the heath family Ericaceae and is endemic to a small area of New South Wales. It is a small, slender, low-lying to erect shrub with hairy branchlets, egg-shaped leaves with a thickened, pointed tip and tube-shaped flowers with white petals.

== Description ==
Epacris apiculata is a slender, low lying to erect shrub with stems up to 1 m (3 ft 3 in) long, the branchlets covered with white hairs. The leaves are egg-shaped with a thickened, pointed tip, mostly 3–10 mm (0.12–0.39 in) long and 2.5–7 mm (0.098–0.276 in) wide and glabrous. The flowers are arranged singly in leaf axils on a peduncle 1.5–2.0 mm (0.059–0.079 in) long, the sepals 2.4–3.9 mm (0.094–0.154 in) long. The petals are white and joined at the base, forming a tube 1.2–3.5 mm (0.047–0.138 in) long with lobes 2.4–5 mm (0.094–0.197 in) long. The anthers are 1–2 mm (0.039–0.079 in) long and the style is 4–6 mm (0.16–0.24 in) long. Flowering occurs from October to January and the fruit is a glabrous capsule about 1.2 mm (0.047 in) long.

== Taxonomy and naming ==
Epacris apiculata was first formally described in 1825 by Allan Cunningham in Barron Field's Geographical Memoirs on New South Wales based on plant material he collected on Kings Tableland. The specific epithet (apiculata) means "ending abruptly in a small point".

== Distribution and habitat ==
This epacris grows in damp places on rock ledges at altitudes between 700 and 1,100 m (2,300 and 3,600 ft) in the Blue Mountains of eastern New South Wales.
