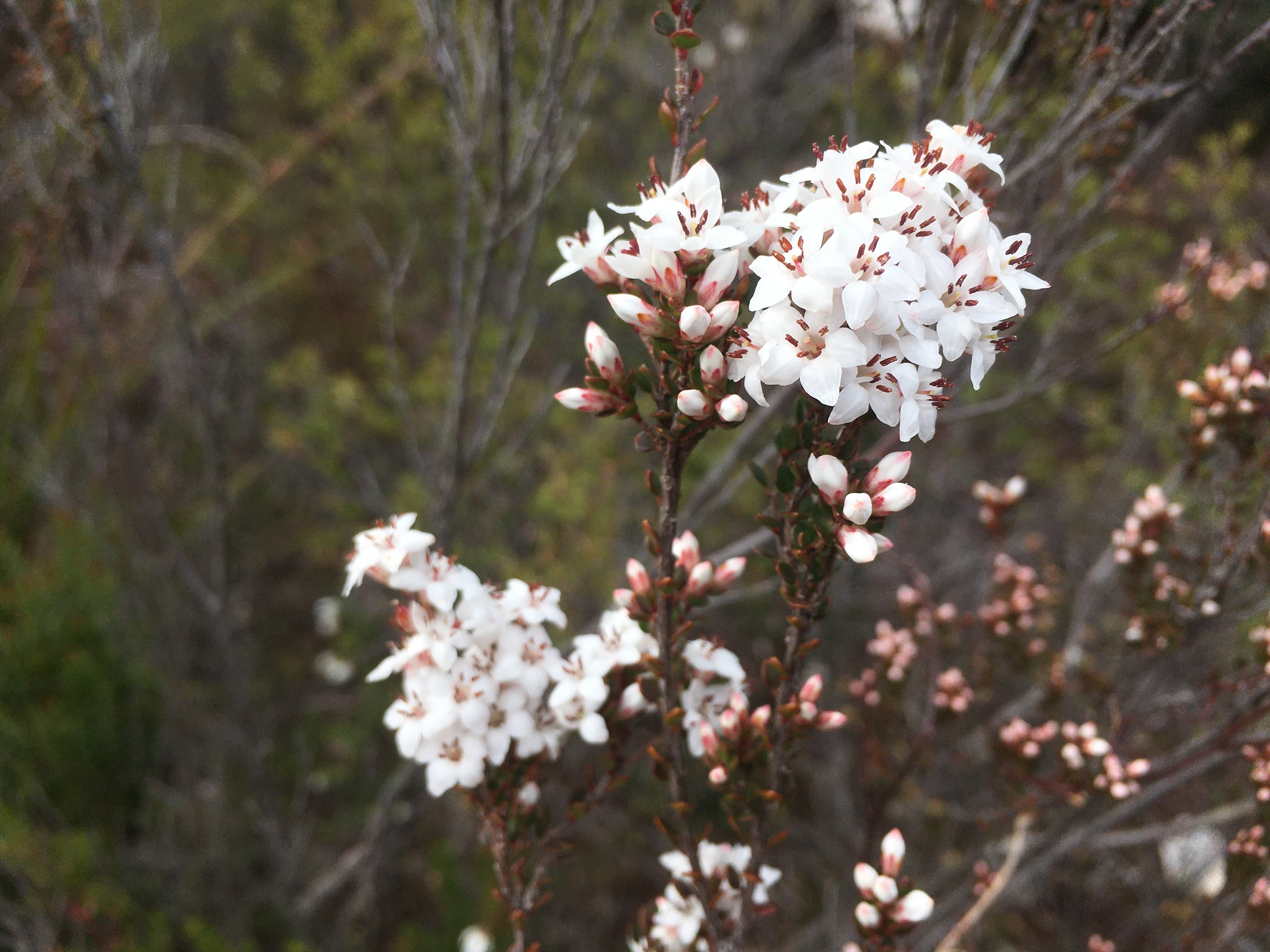
- In the Savage River Regional Reserve

Conservation status
- Endangered (EPBC Act)

Scientific classification
- Kingdom: Plantae
- Clade: Tracheophytes
- Clade: Angiosperms
- Clade: Eudicots
- Clade: Asterids
- Order: Ericales
- Family: Ericaceae
- Genus: Epacris
- Species: E. glabella

Binomial name
- Epacris glabella Jarman

= Epacris glabella =

Species of flowering plant

Epacris glabella, commonly known as smooth heath, is a species of flowering plant in the heath family, Ericaceae, and is endemic to Tasmania. It is a shrub with erect branches, egg-shaped to elliptic leaves and white, tube-shaped flowers.

== Description ==
Epacris glabella is an erect shrub that typically grows to a height of 1–2 m (3 ft 3 in – 6 ft 7 in) and has slender, more or less glabrous branches. The leaves are egg-shaped to elliptic, glabrous, thick and shining, 3.5–7 mm (0.14–0.28 in) long and 2.0–3.5 mm (0.079–0.138 in) wide on a petiole less than 1 mm (0.039 in) long. The flowers are arranged singly in leaf axils and are more or less sessile, the petal tube bell-shaped and 2.5–3.5 mm (0.098–0.138 in) long with five lobes 3–5 mm (0.12–0.20 in) long. The anthers and style protrude beyond the petal tube. Flowering occurs in spring.

== Taxonomy and naming ==
Epacris glabella was first formally described in 1991 by S. Jean Jarman in Aspects of Tasmanian Botany - a tribute to Winifred Curtis from specimens collected in 1986. The specific epithet (glabella) means "glabrous".

== Distribution and habitat ==
Smooth heath grows in soils derived from serpentinite in heath or woodland in hilly places in disjunct populations in north-west Tasmania.

== Conservation status ==
Epacris glabella is listed as "endangered" under the Australian Government Environment Protection and Biodiversity Conservation Act 1999 and the Tasmanian Government Threatened Species Protection Act 1995. The main threats to the species are mining activities, inappropriate fire regimes, and dieback caused by Phytophthora cinnamomi.
