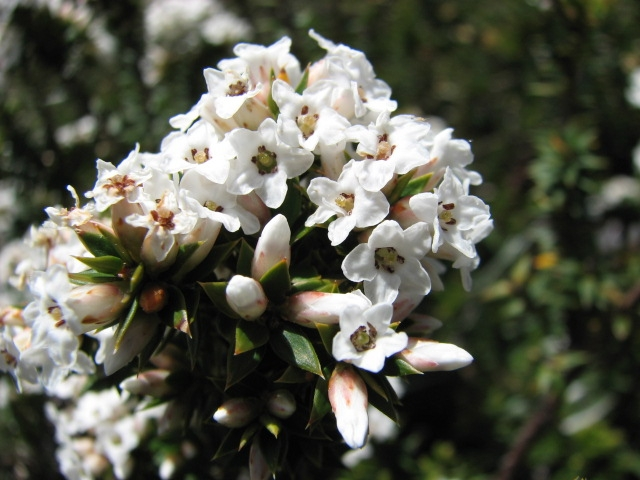
- Epacris breviflora growing in Baw Baw National Park

Scientific classification
- Kingdom: Plantae
- Clade: Tracheophytes
- Clade: Angiosperms
- Clade: Eudicots
- Clade: Asterids
- Order: Ericales
- Family: Ericaceae
- Genus: Epacris
- Species: E. breviflora

Binomial name
- Epacris breviflora Stapf

Synonyms
- Epacris dubia var. subreflexa (DC.) N.E.Br.; Epacris heteronema var. planifolia Benth. nom. illeg. p.p.; Epacris heteronema var. subreflexa DC.

= Epacris breviflora =

Species of flowering plant

Epacris breviflora, commonly known as drumstick heath, is a plant of the heath family, Ericaceae and is endemic to the south-east of the Australian continent. It is an erect shrub with egg-shaped leaves with a sharp-pointed tip and with clusters of white flowers arranged near the end of the branches. It grows in Victoria, New South Wales and the far south-east of Queensland.

== Description ==
Epacris breviflora is an erect shrub that usually grows to a height of 0.5–1.0 m (2–3 ft) and has hairy young branches. The leaves are egg-shaped 4–7.5 mm (0.2–0.3 in) long and about 1.5–3.5 mm (0.06–0.1 in) wide. The leaves have a rounded base and a sharply pointed tip. The flowers are clustered in the axils of the upper leaves. There are 10 to 23 bracts at the base of the flowers and five sepals 3–4 mm (0.1–0.2 in) long. The petals are joined to form a white, bell-shaped tube 2–3 mm (0.08–0.1 in) long with five lobes on the end, 2.5–3.5 mm (0.098–0.14 in) long. The five stamens and the single style are mostly enclosed in the petal tube. Flowering is mainly in summer but flowers are usually present throughout the year. The fruit are capsules about 2 mm (0.08 in) long.

== Taxonomy and naming ==
Epacris breviflora was first formally described in 1910 by Otto Stapf and the description was published in Bulletin of Miscellaneous Information. The specific epithet (breviflora) means "short-flowered".

== Distribution and habitat ==
Drumstick heath mainly occurs along the Great Dividing Range from far south-eastern Queensland to eastern Victoria, sometimes at lower altitudes subject to cooler temperatures. It grows in swamps and other damp places.
