= Epacris exserta =

Conservation status
- Endangered (EPBC Act)

Scientific classification
- Kingdom: Plantae
- Clade: Tracheophytes
- Clade: Angiosperms
- Clade: Eudicots
- Clade: Asterids
- Order: Ericales
- Family: Ericaceae
- Genus: Epacris
- Species: E. exserta

Binomial name
- Epacris exserta R.Br.

Synonyms
- Epacris exserta R.Br. var. exserta

Species of flowering plant

Epacris exserta , commonly known as South Esk heath, is a species of flowering plant in the heath family, Ericaceae and is endemic to Tasmania. It is an erect shrub with narrowly lance-shaped to elliptic leaves and tube-shaped, white flowers clustered near the ends of the branches.

== Description ==
Epacris exserta is an erect shrub that typically grows to a height of up to 1.5 m (4 ft 11 in) and has many glabrous stems. The leaves are narrowly lance-shaped to elliptic, 7–11 mm (0.28–0.43 in) long and 1.1–1.3 mm (0.043–0.051 in) wide with a small, short point on the tip. The flowers are arranged in clusters in leaf axils near the ends of branches on a peduncle covered with bracts. The petals form a cylindrical tube with the stamens and style protruding above the petal lobes.

== Taxonomy ==
Epacris exserta was first formally described in 1810 by Robert Brown in his Prodromus Florae Novae Hollandiae et Insulae Van Diemen. The specific epithet (exserta) means "protruding".

== Distribution and habitat ==
This epacris grows on the banks of the South Esk, North Esk and Supply Rivers in northern Tasmania.

== Conservation status ==
Epacris exserta is listed as "endangered" under the Australian Government Environment Protection and Biodiversity Conservation Act 1999 and the Tasmanian Government Threatened Species Protection Act 1995. The main threats to the species are land clearing, changes in river flow regimes, weed invasion and inappropriate fire regimes.
