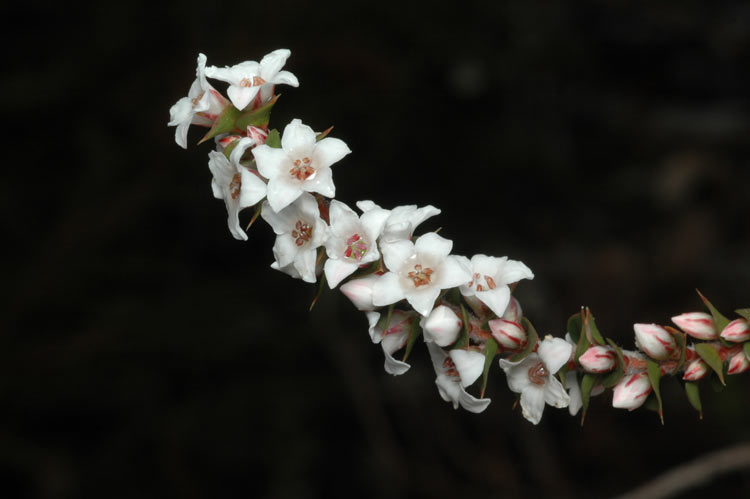
- In the Australian National Botanic Gardens

Scientific classification
- Kingdom: Plantae
- Clade: Tracheophytes
- Clade: Angiosperms
- Clade: Eudicots
- Clade: Asterids
- Order: Ericales
- Family: Ericaceae
- Genus: Epacris
- Species: E. tasmanica

Binomial name
- Epacris tasmanica W.M.Curtis

Synonyms
- Epacris serpillifolia var. squarrosa Rodway orth. var.; Epacris serpyllifolia var. squarrosa Benth.; Epacris squarrosa Hook.f. nom. illeg.

= Epacris tasmanica =

Species of flowering plant

Epacris tasmanica is a species of flowering plant in the heath family Ericaceae and is endemic to Tasmania. It is an erect shrub with lance-shaped leaves and tube-shaped white flowers crowded in upper leaf axils.

== Description ==
Epacris tasmanica is an erect, sometimes bushy shrub that grows to a height of up to 2 m (6 ft 7 in) but typically less than 1 m (3 ft 3 in), and has few branches, the stems and branchlets hairy when young. Its leaves are spreading, lance-shaped, 3–8 mm (0.12–0.31 in) long, 2.0–3.5 mm (0.079–0.138 in) wide and sharply pointed, on a petiole less than 0.5 mm (0.020 in) long. The flowers are clustered near the ends of branches on pedicels 1.0–2.8 mm (0.039–0.110 in) long with creamy-white bracts at the base. The sepals are about 3–7 mm (0.12–0.28 in) long, lance-shaped and about the same length as the petal tube. The petal tube is bell-shaped, 2.5–5 mm (0.098–0.197 in) long with lobes 3.5–5.5 mm (0.14–0.22 in) long.

== Taxonomy ==
Epacris tasmanica was first formally described in 1969 by Winifred Curtis in the journal Taxon.

== Distribution ==
This epacris is endemic to Tasmania where it is common and widespread in the east of the state, where it grows in stony soil at low altitudes.
