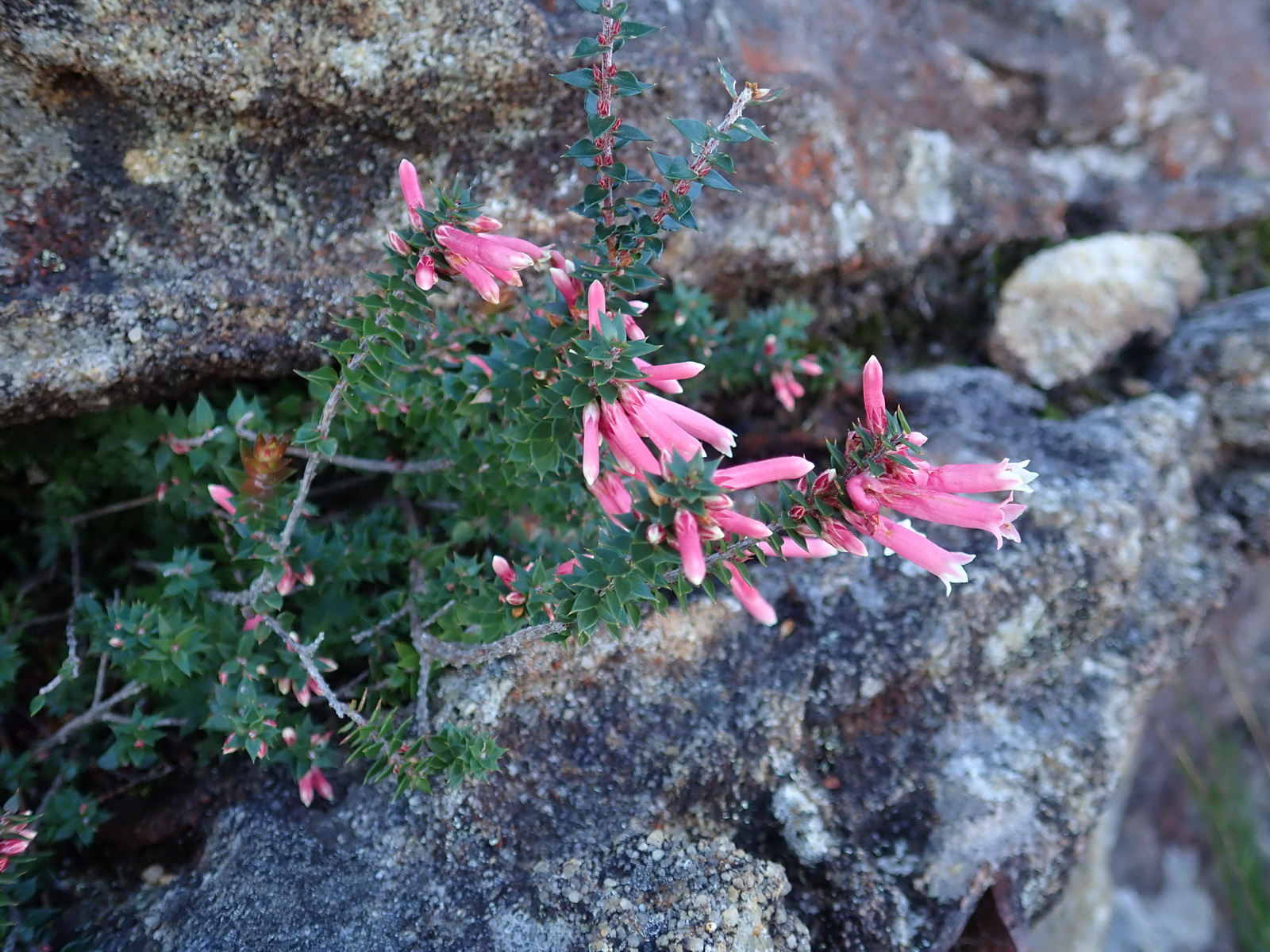

Scientific classification
- Kingdom: Plantae
- Clade: Tracheophytes
- Clade: Angiosperms
- Clade: Eudicots
- Clade: Asterids
- Order: Ericales
- Family: Ericaceae
- Genus: Epacris
- Species: E. reclinata

Binomial name
- Epacris reclinata A.Cunn. ex Benth.
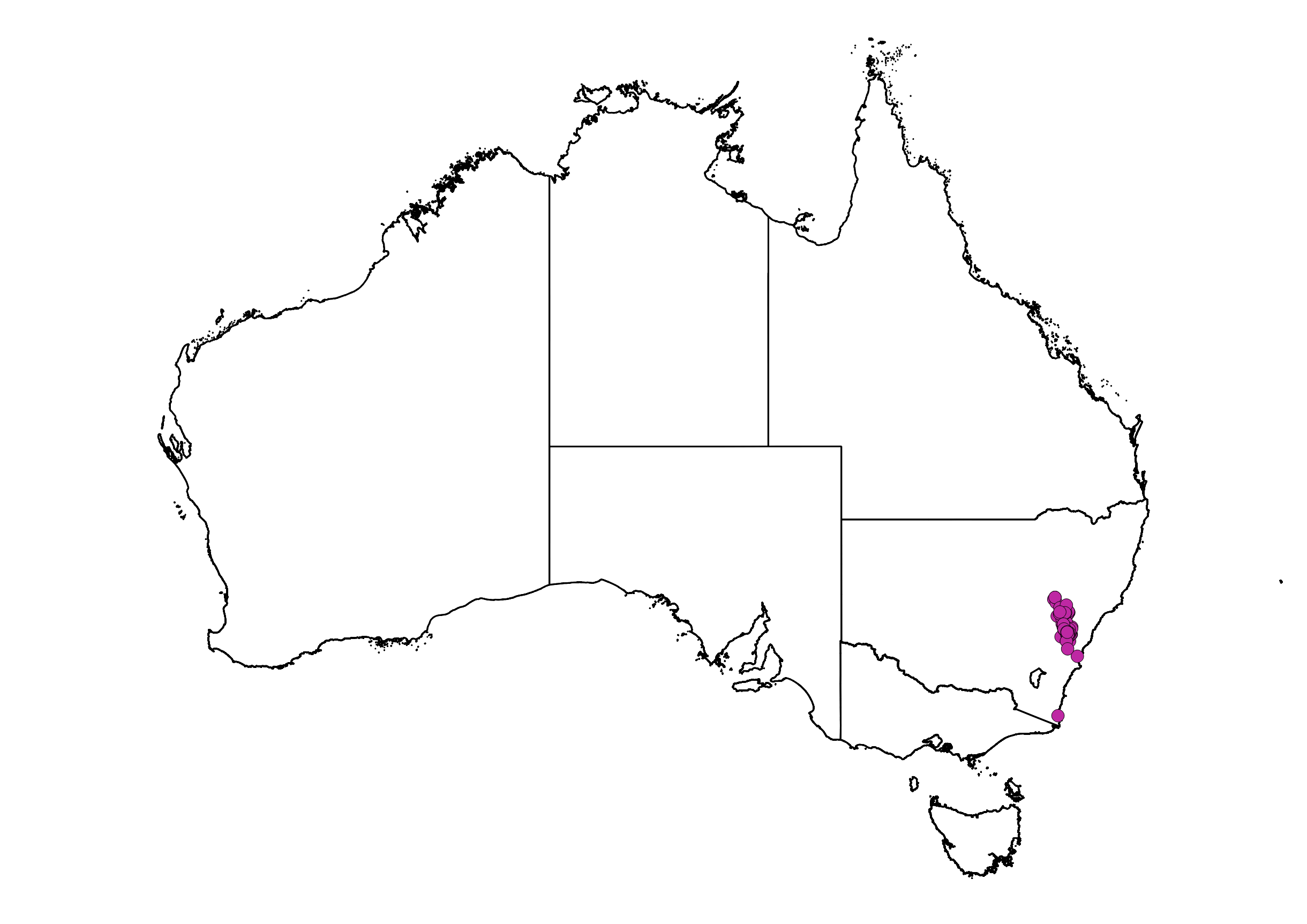
- Occurrence data from AVH

= Epacris reclinata =

Species of flowering plant

Epacris reclinata, commonly known as fuchsia heath, is a species of flowering plant in the family Ericaceae and is endemic to eastern New South Wales. It is a low-lying to spreading shrub with egg-shaped leaves and pink to red, tube-shaped flowers, sometimes with lighter tips.

== Description ==
Epacris reclinata is a low-lying to spreading shrub that typically grows to a height of up to 60 cm (24 in) and has shaggy-hairy branchlets, the stems with conspicuous leaf scars. The leaves are egg-shaped, 5.0–8.8 mm (0.20–0.35 in) long and 2.4–5.2 mm (0.094–0.205 in) wide on a petiole 0.6–0.9 mm (0.024–0.035 in) long. The flowers are arranged in leaf axils extending down the branches and are 4.5–6.0 mm (0.18–0.24 in) wide, each flower on a peduncle up to 2.5 mm (0.098 in) long. The sepals are 2.6–4.1 mm (0.10–0.16 in) long and the petals pink to red are joined at the base to form a tube 9.0–17.3 mm (0.35–0.68 in) long with lobes 1.7–3 mm (0.067–0.118 in) long and sometimes paler than the rest of the tube. The anthers are enclosed within the petal tube. Flowering occurs from June to December, and the fruit is a capsule about 2 mm (0.079 in) long.

== Taxonomy and naming ==
Epacris reclinata was first formally described in 1868 by George Bentham from an unpublished description by Allan Cunningham and the description was published in Flora Australiensis. The specific epithet (reclinata) means "leaning back".

== Distribution and habitat ==
Fuchsia heath grows in woodland and heath on damp sandstone cliff faces and rock ledges in the Blue Mountains, and Southern Highlands of eastern New South Wales.
