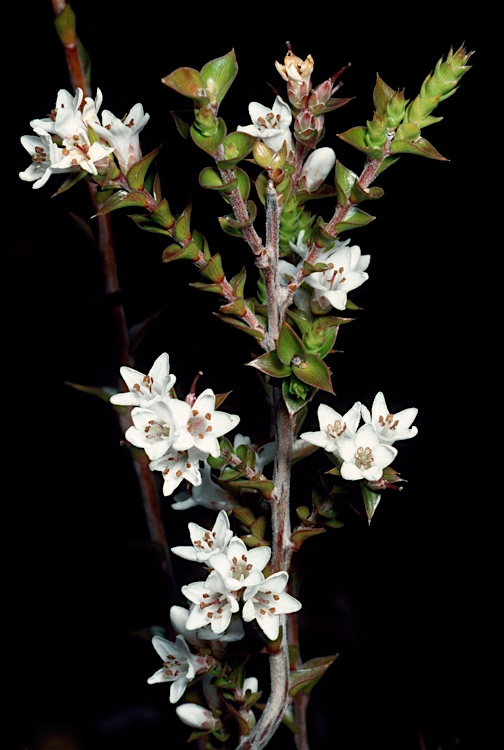
- In the Australian National Botanic Gardens

Scientific classification
- Kingdom: Plantae
- Clade: Tracheophytes
- Clade: Angiosperms
- Clade: Eudicots
- Clade: Asterids
- Order: Ericales
- Family: Ericaceae
- Genus: Epacris
- Species: E. acuminata

Binomial name
- Epacris acuminata Benth.

= Epacris acuminata =

Species of flowering plant

Epacris acuminata, commonly known as claspleaf heath, is a species of flowering plant in the heath family Ericaceae and is endemic to Tasmania. It is a small, spreading shrub with egg-shaped, stem-clasping leaves and tube-shaped flowers with white petals.

== Description ==
Epacris acuminata is an erect shrub that typically grows to a height of up to 1.5 m (4 ft 11 in), and has many branches from near the base. The leaves are egg-shaped, concave and stem-clasping, 4–9 mm (0.16–0.35 in) long and 3–5 mm (0.12–0.20 in) wide on a petiole less than 1 mm (0.039 in) long. The tip of the leaves is sharply-pointed and there are five to seven veins showing on the lower surface. The flowers are arranged singly in leaf axils in dense clusters along the branches. The petals are white and joined at the base, forming a tube 4–6 mm (0.16–0.24 in) long with lobes about the same length. The style is 6–8 mm (0.24–0.31 in) long and protrudes from the petal tube with the stamens. Flowering occurs from July to October and the fruit is a capsule about 2 mm (0.079 in) long with the remains of the sepals and bracts attached.

== Taxonomy and naming ==
Epacris acuminata was first formally described in 1868 by George Bentham in Flora Australiensis. The specific epithet (acuminata) means "tapering to a narrow point".

== Distribution and habitat ==
Claspleaf heath grows in low shrubland on mountain peaks, in heathy woodland, forest and along watercourse. It occurs in the south-east, the midlands and the eastern edge of the Central Plateau in Tasmania.
