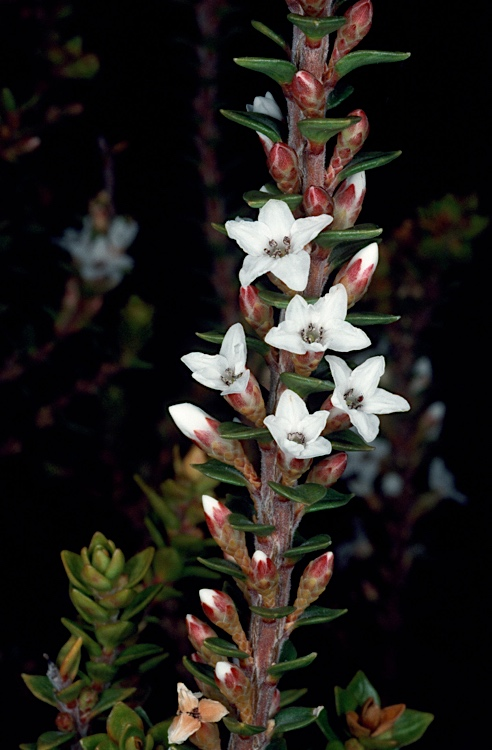
- In the Australian National Botanic Gardens

Scientific classification
- Kingdom: Plantae
- Clade: Tracheophytes
- Clade: Angiosperms
- Clade: Eudicots
- Clade: Asterids
- Order: Ericales
- Family: Ericaceae
- Genus: Epacris
- Species: E. myrtifolia

Binomial name
- Epacris myrtifolia Labill.

= Epacris myrtifolia =

Species of flowering plant

Epacris myrtifolia is a species of flowering plant in the heath family Ericaceae and is endemic to Tasmania. It is an erect shrub that typically grows to a height of 15–50 cm (5.9–19.7 in). Its leaves are thick, crowded, egg-shaped with a small, blunt point on the tip, and 4.2–8.5 mm (0.17–0.33 in) long. The flowers are arranged singly in a few upper leaf axils with many leathery bracts at the base. The sepals are leathery, about 4.2 mm (0.17 in) long, the petal tube slightly shorter than the sepals with lobes about the same length, the anthers protruding slightly from the petal tube.

Epacris heteronema was first formally described in 1805 by Jacques Labillardière in his Novae Hollandiae Plantarum Specimen.

This epacris grows in exposed coastal scrub in the south-east of Tasmania.
