= Epacris apsleyensis =

Conservation status
- Endangered (EPBC Act)

Scientific classification
- Kingdom: Plantae
- Clade: Tracheophytes
- Clade: Angiosperms
- Clade: Eudicots
- Clade: Asterids
- Order: Ericales
- Family: Ericaceae
- Genus: Epacris
- Species: E. apsleyensis

Binomial name
- Epacris apsleyensis Crowden

Species of flowering plant

Epacris apsleyensis is a species of flowering plant in the heath family Ericaceae and is endemic to a small area of Tasmania. It is an erect shrub with hairy branchlets, lance-shaped to elliptic leaves and tube-shaped flowers with white petals.

== Description ==
Epacris apsleyensis is an erect shrub that typically grows to a height of up to 1.5 m (4 ft 11 in), its branchlets covered with reddish-brown hairs. The leaves are lance-shaped to elliptic, 5–9 mm (0.20–0.35 in) long and 2–3 mm (0.079–0.118 in) wide on a petiole about 1 mm (0.039 in) long. There are a few soft hairs on the upper surface of the leaves but the lower surface is glabrous. The flowers are arranged singly in leaf axils near the tips of the branches and are more or less sessile, with white, egg-shaped bracts near the base. The sepals are white, egg-shaped to lance-shaped, 3–4 mm (0.12–0.16 in) long. The petals are white and joined at the base, forming a bell-shaped tube 2–3 mm (0.079–0.118 in) long with lobes 3–4 mm (0.12–0.16 in) long and 2–3 mm (0.079–0.118 in) wide. The style is 1.0–1.5 mm (0.039–0.059 in) long and is enclosed in the petal tube with the stamens. Flowering occurs from January to November.

== Taxonomy and naming ==
Epacris apsleyensis was first formally described in 1986 by Ron Crowden in Papers and Proceedings of the Royal Society of Tasmania based on plant material he collected near Bicheno in 1984. The specific epithet (apsleyensis) refers to the species' habitat near the Apsley River.

== Distribution and habitat ==
This epacris grows in low, open forest near the Apsley River in eastern Tasmania.

== Conservation status ==
Epacris apsleyensis is classified as "endangered" under the Australian Government Environment Protection and Biodiversity Conservation Act 1999 and the Tasmanian Government Threatened Species Protection Act 1995. The main threats to the species include dieback due to the fungus Phytophthora cinnamomi, inappropriate fire regimes, land clearing and weed invasion.
