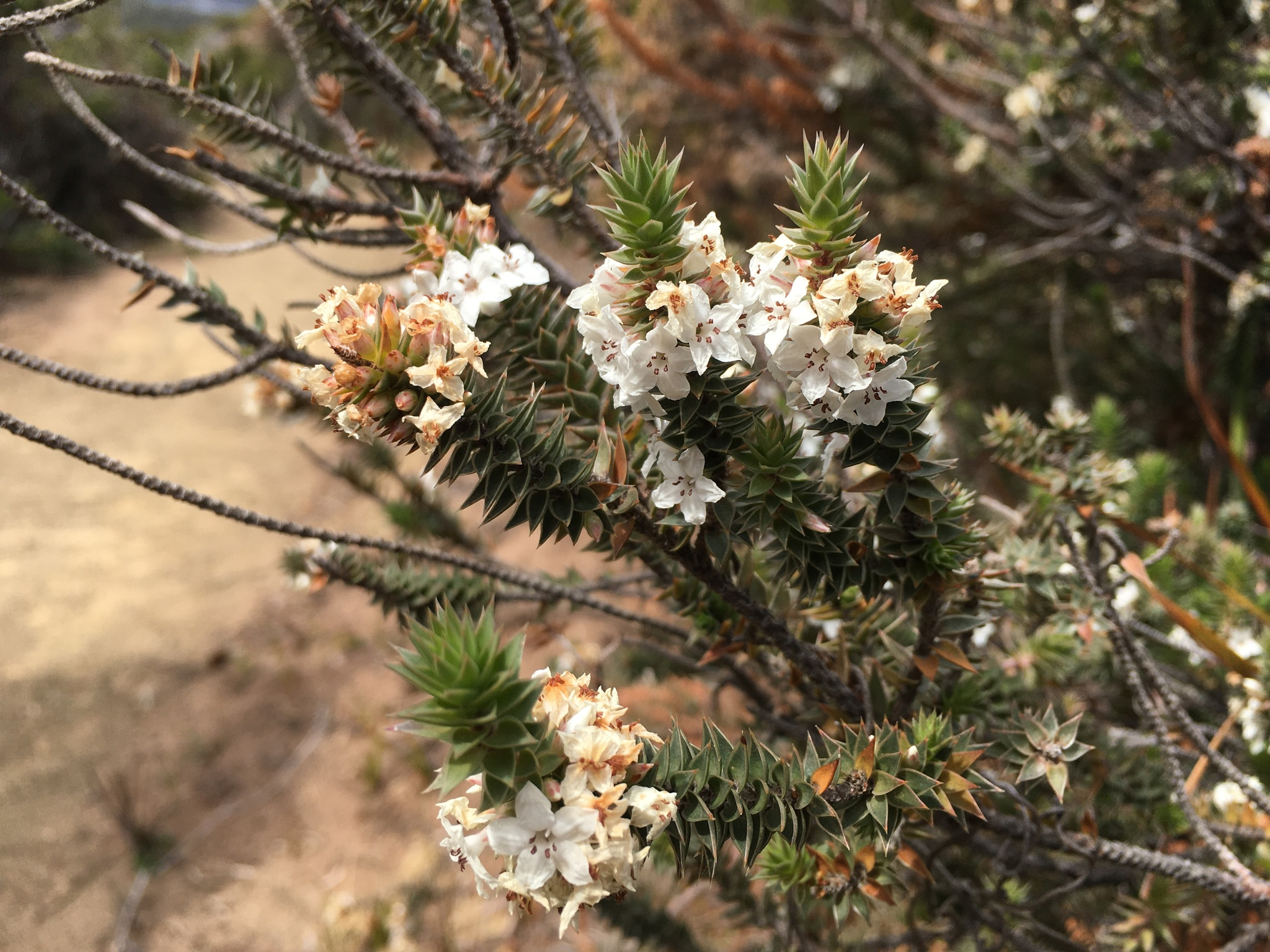
- At Port Arthur

Scientific classification
- Kingdom: Plantae
- Clade: Tracheophytes
- Clade: Angiosperms
- Clade: Eudicots
- Clade: Asterids
- Order: Ericales
- Family: Ericaceae
- Genus: Epacris
- Species: E. marginata

Binomial name
- Epacris marginata Melville

= Epacris marginata =

Species of flowering plant

Epacris marginata is a species of flowering plant in the heath family Ericaceae and is endemic to Tasmania. It is an erect shrub with overlapping, bluish, sharply-pointed, egg-shaped to lance-shaped leaves with transparent edges and white, tube-shaped flowers, the petals with lobes 3–5 mm (0.12–0.20 in) long and 2.5–3.0 mm (0.098–0.118 in) wide.

Epacris marginata was first formally described in 1952 by Ronald Melville in the Kew Bulletin from specimens collected by Janet Somerville on the "slopes of Brown Mountain, Tasman Peninsula" in 1946.

This epacris is restricted to the Tasman Peninsula in Tasmania.
