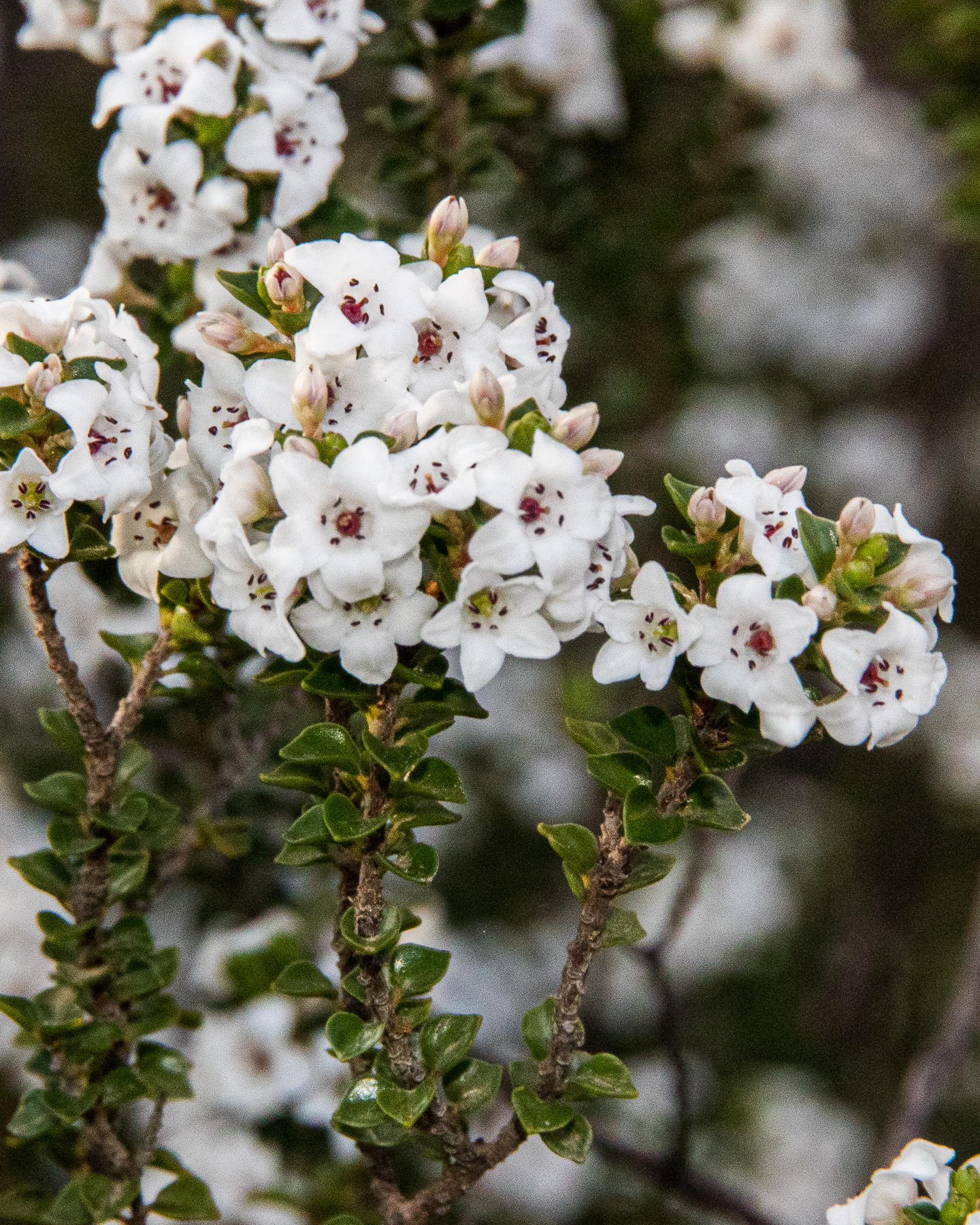
- Near Wentworth Falls

Scientific classification
- Kingdom: Plantae
- Clade: Tracheophytes
- Clade: Angiosperms
- Clade: Eudicots
- Clade: Asterids
- Order: Ericales
- Family: Ericaceae
- Genus: Epacris
- Species: E. browniae

Binomial name
- Epacris browniae Coleby

= Epacris browniae =

Species of flowering plant

Epacris browniae is a species of flowering plant in the heath family Ericaceae and is endemic to a small area of New South Wales. It is an erect, woody shrub with wand-like branchlets, crowded, glabrous, trowel-shaped leaves, and tube-shaped flowers with white petals.

== Description ==
Epacris browmniae is an erect, woody shrub that typically grows to a height of up to 1 m (3 ft 3 in) high and has wand-like branchlets. The leaves are broadly trowel-shaped and concave, 3.0–3.5 mm (0.12–0.14 in) long and 2.5–3.0 mm (0.098–0.118 in) wide on a straw-coloured petiole 0.8 mm (0.031 in) long. The flowers are arranged singly in leaf axils extending down the branchlets, each flower on a peduncle about 2.5 mm (0.098 in) long. The flowers are 5.5–6.5 mm (0.22–0.26 in) in diameter, the sepals 1.0–1.2 mm (0.039–0.047 in) long with minute teeth on the edges. The petals are white and joined at the base, forming a bell-shaped tube 1.2–3.5 mm (0.047–0.138 in) long. The stamen filaments are fused to the petal tube and the anthers are level with the end of the tube. Flowering mainly occurs in November and the fruit is a brown capsule about 2 mm (0.079 in) long.

== Taxonomy ==
Epacris browniae was first formally described in 2015 by David Coleby in the journal Telopea from specimens he collected from near Wentworth Falls in 2014. The specific epithet (browniae) honours epacris researcher Elizabeth Anne Brown.

== Distribution and habitat ==
This epacris grows on rocky outcrops in scrub and heath in the Blue Mountains in eastern New South Wales.
