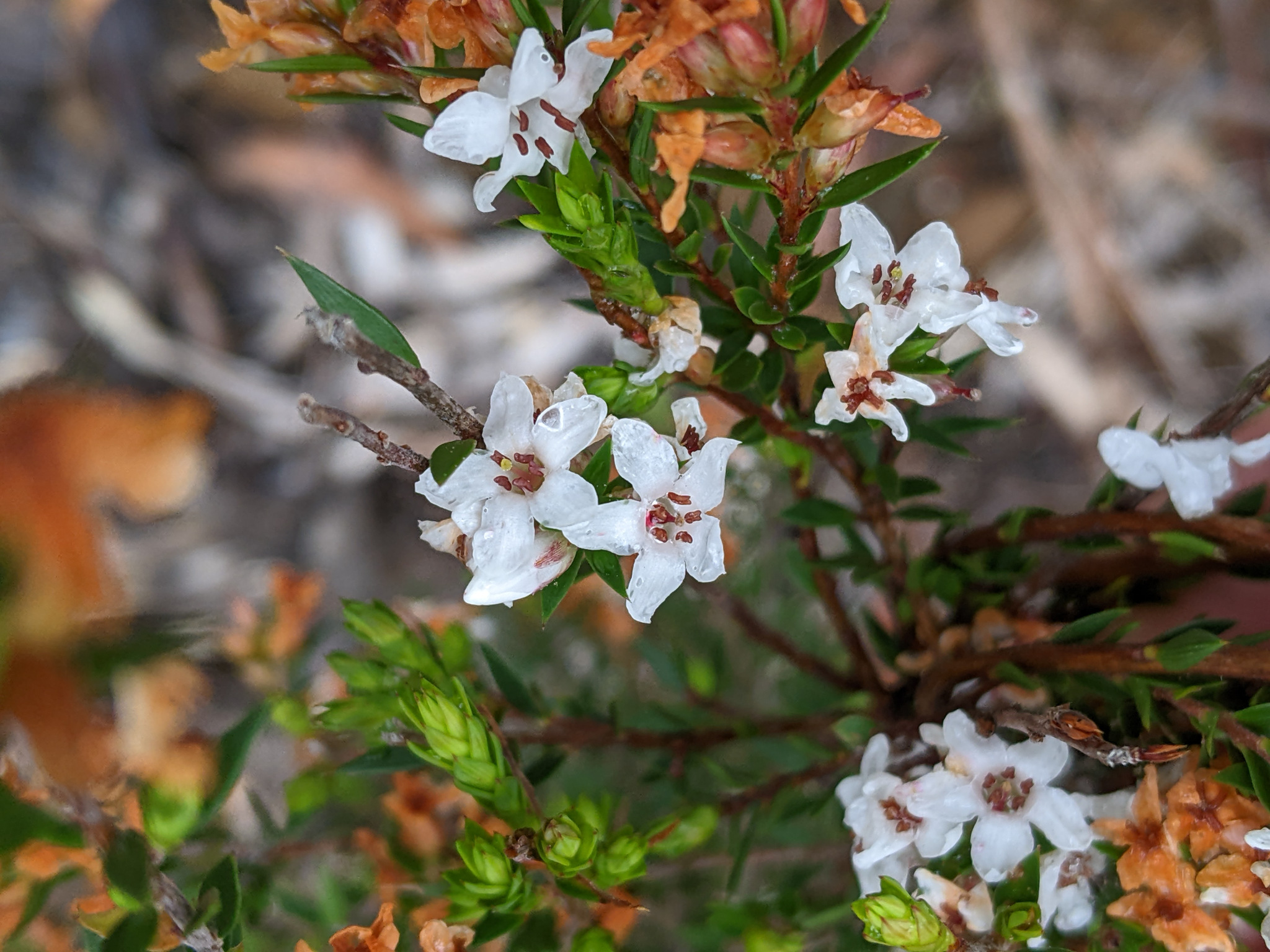
- In the Douglas-Apsley National Park

Scientific classification
- Kingdom: Plantae
- Clade: Tracheophytes
- Clade: Angiosperms
- Clade: Eudicots
- Clade: Asterids
- Order: Ericales
- Family: Ericaceae
- Genus: Epacris
- Species: E. cerasicollina

Binomial name
- Epacris cerasicollina Crowden

= Epacris cerasicollina =

Species of flowering plant

Epacris cerasicollina is a species of flowering plant in the heath family Ericaceae and is endemic to Tasmania. It is a shrub with lance-shaped to egg-shaped, slightly concave leaves and tube-shaped white flowers mostly clustered in upper leaf axils.

== Description ==
Epacris cerasicollina is a shrub that typically grows to a height of 0.5–1.5 m (1 ft 8 in – 4 ft 11 in) and has several erect stems. Its leaves are more or less flat, lance-shaped to egg-shaped, slightly concave at the base, 3–8 mm (0.12–0.31 in) long and 2–4 mm (0.079–0.157 in) wide on a petiole less than 1 mm (0.039 in) long and with a sharply pointed tip. The flowers are clustered in a few leaf axils near the ends of branches, each on a peduncle 2.5–4 mm (0.098–0.157 in) long. The five sepals are glabrous apart from a few hairs on the edges and the petals are white, joined at the base to form a white tube 2.9–4.1 mm (0.11–0.16 in) long. The five stamens and the style extend slightly beyond the end of the petal tube.

== Taxonomy and naming ==
Epacris cerasicollina was first formally described in 1995 by R.K.Crowden in the journal Muelleria from specimens collected near the Swan River in 1987. The specific epithet (cerasicollina) means "cherry hill", referring to Cherry Tree Hill, where there is a large population of this species.

== Distribution and habitat ==
This epacris grows in grassland and open woodland, often in moist places and near watercourses, and occurs on the east coast of Tasmania, including on the Freycinet Peninsula and Schouten Island, and inland as far as Lake Leake, at altitudes up to 300 m (980 ft).
