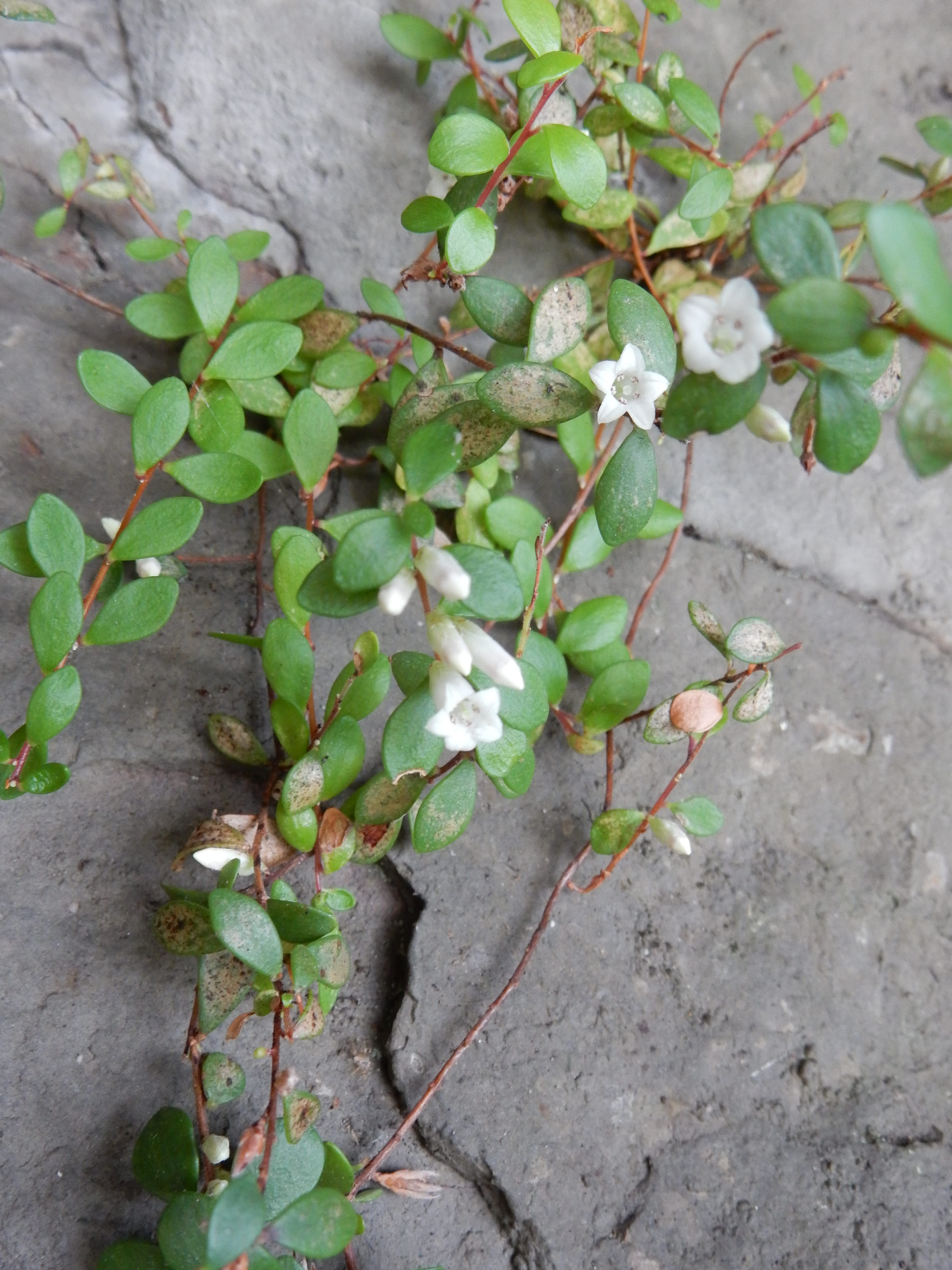
- Epacris crassifolia growing on Hawkesbury sandstone at Garigal National Park.

Scientific classification
- Kingdom: Plantae
- Clade: Tracheophytes
- Clade: Angiosperms
- Clade: Eudicots
- Clade: Asterids
- Order: Ericales
- Family: Ericaceae
- Genus: Epacris
- Species: E. crassifolia

Binomial name
- Epacris crassifolia R.Br.

= Epacris crassifolia =

Species of flowering plant

Epacris crassifolia is a species of flowering plant in the heath family Ericaceae and is endemic to south-eastern New South Wales, Australia. It is a low-lying shrub with elliptic to egg-shaped leaves with the lower end towards the base, and tube-shaped, white or cream-coloured flowers clustered near the ends of the branches.

== Description ==
Epacris crassifolia is a low-lying shrub that typically grows to a height of up to 20 cm (7.9 in) and has stems with prominent leaf scars. The leaves are elliptic to egg-shaped with the narrower end towards the base, 5–13 mm (0.20–0.51 in) long and 1.5–7 mm (0.059–0.276 in) wide on a petiole 0.6–1.8 mm (0.024–0.071 in) long. The flowers are arranged in clusters near the ends of branches and are white or cream-coloured, tube-shaped and swollen near the middle, their size depending on subspecies, on a peduncle 1.5–5 mm (0.059–0.197 in) long. Flowering occurs from November to January and the fruit is a capsule 1.4–2.8 mm (0.055–0.110 in) long.

== Taxonomy ==
Epacris crassifolia was first formally described in 1810 by Robert Brown in his Prodromus Florae Novae Hollandiae et Insulae Van Diemen. The specific epithet (crassifolia) means "thick-leaved".

In 1996, R.K. Crowden and Yvonne Menadue described two subspecies of E. crassifolia and the names are accepted by the Australian Plant Census:

- Epacris crassifolia R.Br. subsp. crassifolia has flowers 3.0–5.5 mm (0.12–0.22 in) in diameter, each flower on a pedicel 2.5–3.5 mm (0.098–0.138 in) long, with sepals 3–4 mm (0.12–0.16 in) long, a petal tube 5.5–7 mm (0.22–0.28 in) long and anthers about 1 mm (0.039 in) long;
- Epacris crassifolia subsp. macroflora Crowden & Menadue has flowers 6–10 mm (0.24–0.39 in) in diameter, each flower on a pedicel 4–7 mm (0.16–0.28 in) long with sepals 4.0–6.5 mm (0.16–0.26 in) long, a petal tube 10–25 mm (0.39–0.98 in) long and anthers about 2 mm (0.079 in) long.

== Distribution and habitat ==
This epacris grows on sandstone rock ledges and in rock crevices on the Central and South Coasts of New South Wales and inland as far as the Blue Mountains.
