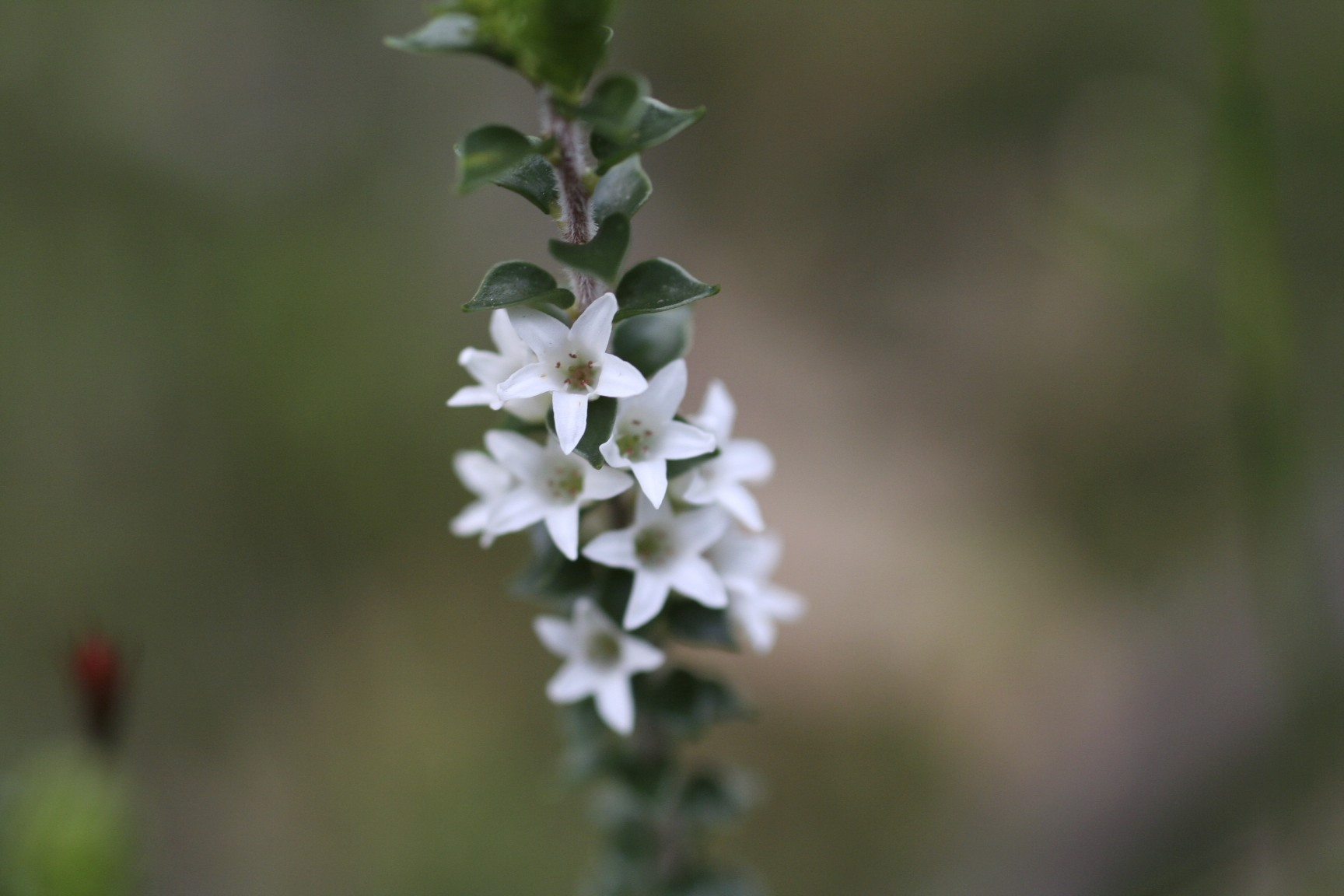
- On the Illawarra escarpment

Scientific classification
- Kingdom: Plantae
- Clade: Tracheophytes
- Clade: Angiosperms
- Clade: Eudicots
- Clade: Asterids
- Order: Ericales
- Family: Ericaceae
- Genus: Epacris
- Species: E. coriacea

Binomial name
- Epacris coriacea A.Cunn. ex DC.

= Epacris coriacea =

Species of flowering plant

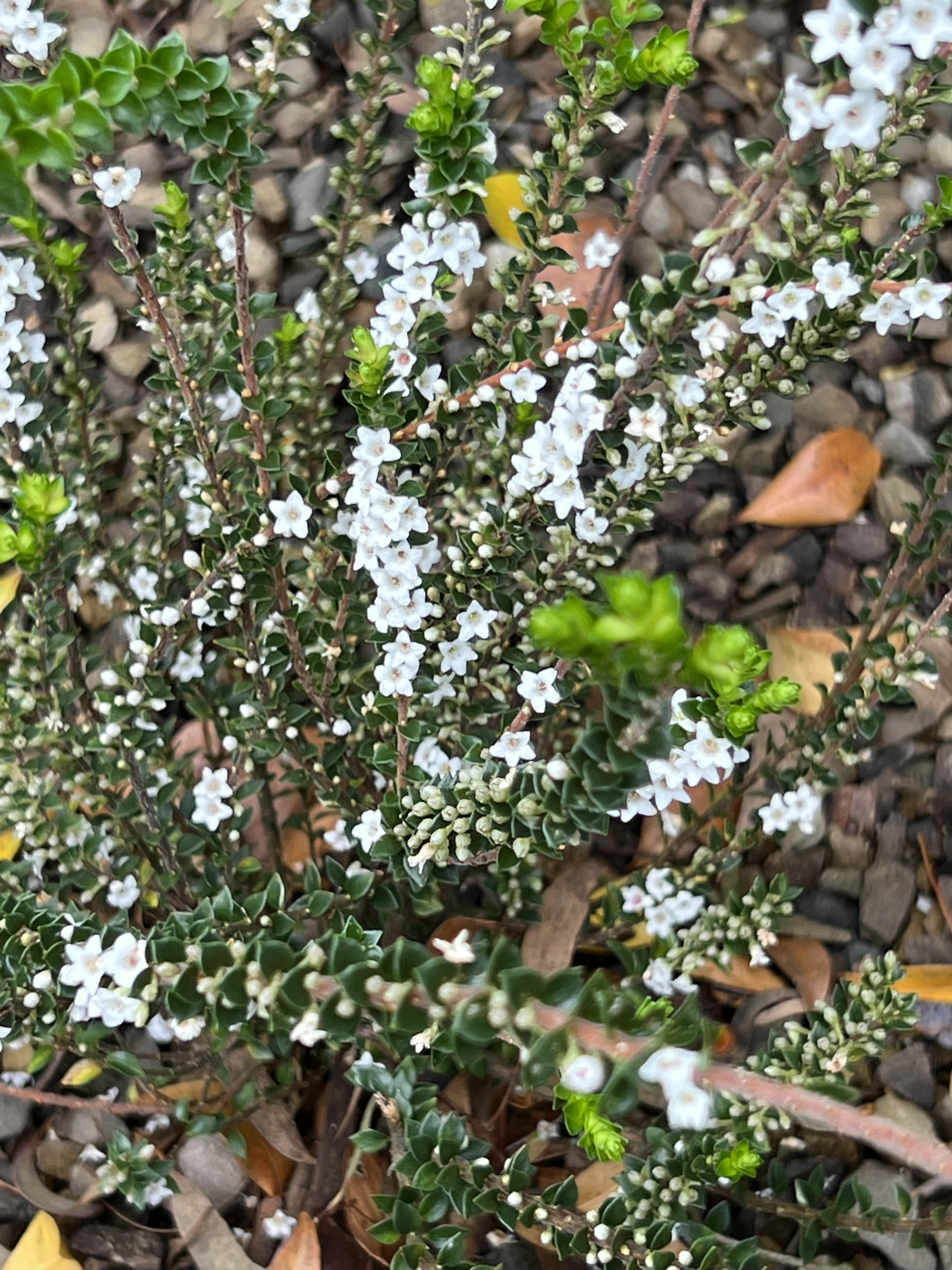
Habit

Epacris coriacea is a species of flowering plant in the heath family Ericaceae and is endemic to eastern New South Wales. It is a slender, erect shrub with hairy branchlets, egg-shaped to more or less diamond-shaped leaves and tube-shaped, white or cream-coloured flowers.

== Description ==
Epacris coriacea is a slender, erect shrub that typically grows to a height of 0.5–1 m (1 ft 8 in – 3 ft 3 in), the branchlets softy-hairy and the stems with prominent leaf scars. The leaves are thick, egg-shaped to broadly elliptic or more or less diamond-shaped, 3.8–12.4 mm (0.15–0.49 in) long and 3.2–7.6 mm (0.13–0.30 in) wide on a petiole 0.7–2.5 mm (0.028–0.098 in) long. The flowers are arranged singly in leaf axils on a peduncle 3.0–4.5 mm (0.12–0.18 in) long and are 5.0–6.5 mm (0.20–0.26 in) wide, the sepals 2–3 mm (0.079–0.118 in) long. The petals are white to cream-coloured, forming a tube 1.5–2.5 mm (0.059–0.098 in) long with lobes 2.3–3.2 mm (0.091–0.126 in) long, the anthers protruding slightly beyond the petal tube. Flowering occurs in September and October and the fruit is a capsule about 1.4 mm (0.055 in) long.

== Taxonomy and naming ==
Epacris coriacea was first formally described in 1839 by Augustin Pyramus de Candolle in his Prodromus Systematis Naturalis Regni Vegetabilis from an unpublished description by Allan Cunningham of plants he collected on the Illawarra escarpment. The specific epithet (coriacea) means "leathery".

== Distribution and habitat ==
This epacris grows on cliffs and in rock crevices from the Woronora Plateau to near Rylstone in eastern New South Wales.
