= Epacris moscaliana =

Scientific classification
- Kingdom: Plantae
- Clade: Tracheophytes
- Clade: Angiosperms
- Clade: Eudicots
- Clade: Asterids
- Order: Ericales
- Family: Ericaceae
- Genus: Epacris
- Species: E. moscaliana

Binomial name
- Epacris moscaliana Crowden

Species of flowering plant

Epacris moscaliana, commonly known as seepage heath, is a species of flowering plant in the heath family Ericaceae and is endemic to Tasmania. It is a bushy shrub with wand-like branches, narrowly lance-shaped to egg-shaped or round leaves, and bell-shaped white flowers in clusters at the ends of the branches.

== Description ==
Epacris moscaliana is a bushy shrub that typically grows to a height of up to 50 cm (20 in), sometimes up to 1.5 m (4 ft 11 in) in sheltered sites, and has wand-like branches. Its leaves are narrowly lance-shaped to egg-shaped or round, 2.1–3.5 mm (0.083–0.138 in) long and 1.3–2.9 mm (0.051–0.114 in) wide on a petiole up to half the length of the leaf blade. The flowers are arranged in small clusters near the ends of branches with egg-shaped pinkish bracts at the base. The five sepals are tinged with pink, egg-shaped and 2–5 mm (0.079–0.197 in) long. The petals are white, joined at the base to form a bell-shaped tube 2.0–4.7 mm (0.079–0.185 in) long with five lobes that are longer than the tube. The style and anthers extend well beyond the end of the tube.

== Taxonomy and naming ==
Epacris moscaliana was first formally described in 1995 by R.K.Crowden in the journal Muelleria from specimens he collected in 2003 near the Dukes River in north-eastern Tasmania. The specific epithet (moscaliana) honours the plant collector, Tony Moscal.

== Distribution and habitat ==
Seepage heath grows in marsh edges and on the edges of watercourses in north-eastern Tasmania.

== Conservation status ==
Epacris moscaliana is listed as "rare" under the Tasmanian Government Threatened Species Protection Act 1995. The main threats to the species are land clearing and weed invasion, inappropriate fire regimes and disease caused by Phytophthora cinnamomi.
