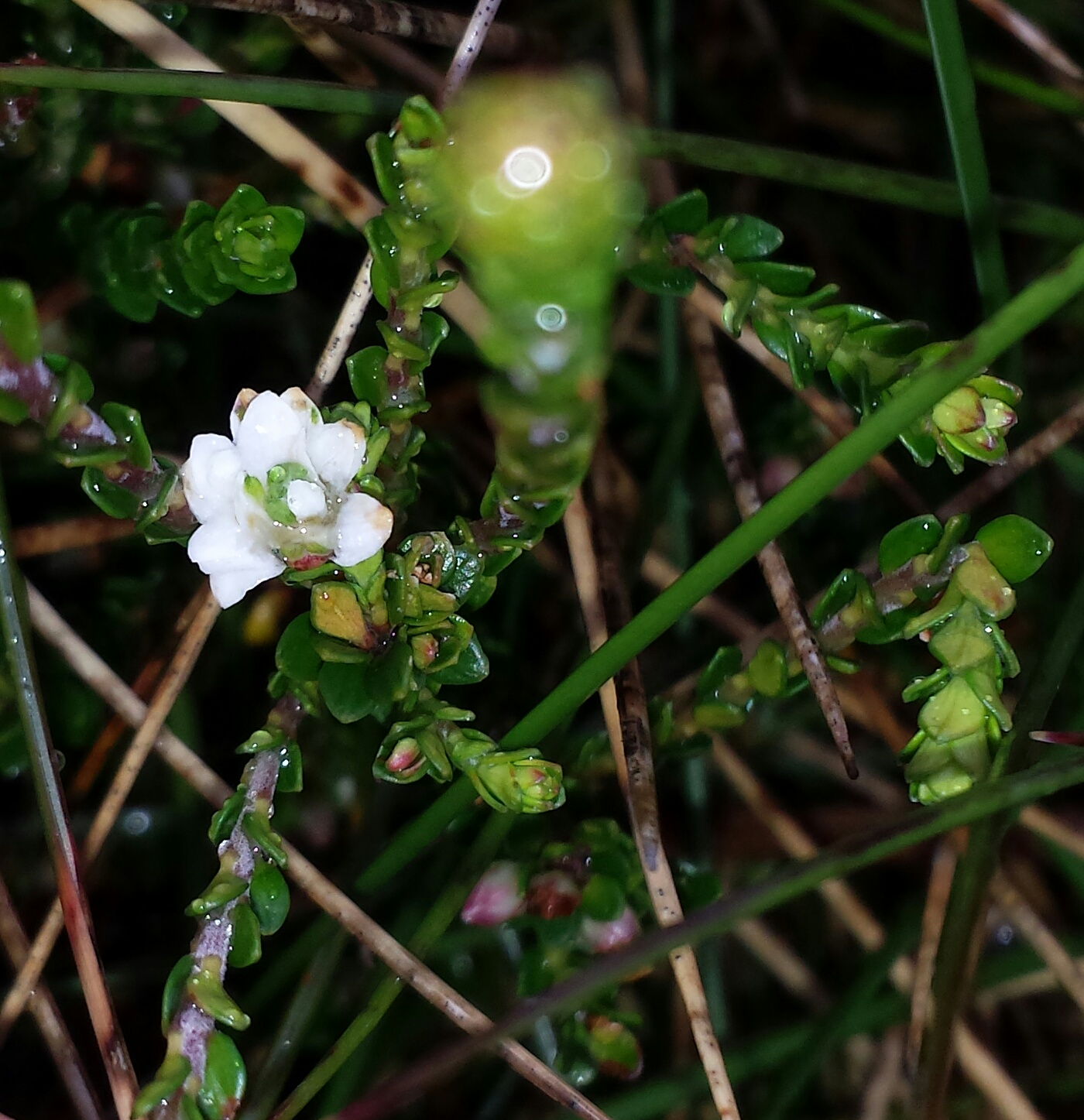
- Near Rocky Valley Dam

Scientific classification
- Kingdom: Plantae
- Clade: Tracheophytes
- Clade: Angiosperms
- Clade: Eudicots
- Clade: Asterids
- Order: Ericales
- Family: Ericaceae
- Genus: Epacris
- Species: E. celata

Binomial name
- Epacris celata Crowden

= Epacris celata =

Species of flowering plant

Epacris celata is a species of flowering plant in the heath family Ericaceae and is endemic to south-eastern continental Australia. It is a spreading to erect shrub with flat, elliptic to egg-shaped leaves with the narrower end towards the base, and tube-shaped white flowers clustered in upper leaf axils.

== Description ==
Epacris celata is a spreading to erect shrub that typically grows to a height of 20–60 cm (7.9–23.6 in) and has reddish-brown young stems. Its leaves are more or less flat, elliptic to egg-shaped with the narrower end towards the base 2–3 mm (0.079–0.118 in) long and 1.4–2.5 mm (0.055–0.098 in) wide on a petiole up to 1 mm (0.039 in) long. The flowers are clustered in a few leaf axils near the ends of branches, each on a peduncle 1–2 mm (0.039–0.079 in) long. The five sepals are 2.5–3 mm (0.098–0.118 in) long and the petals are joined to form a white tube, 1.0–1.5 mm (0.039–0.059 in) long, the lobes 2–3 mm (0.079–0.118 in) long. The five stamens and the style are enclosed in the petal tube.

== Taxonomy and naming ==
Epacris celata was first formally described in 1995 by R.K.Crowden in the journal, Muelleria from specimens collected on the Bogong High Plains in 1993. The specific epithet (celata) means "concealed", because the plant is hidden with other species and is only noticed when flowering.

== Distribution and habitat ==
This epacris grows in alpine heath in wet places or near streams on higher mountains of the Bogong High Plains in Victoria and near Mount Kosciuszko and in Wadbilliga National Park in New South Wales.
