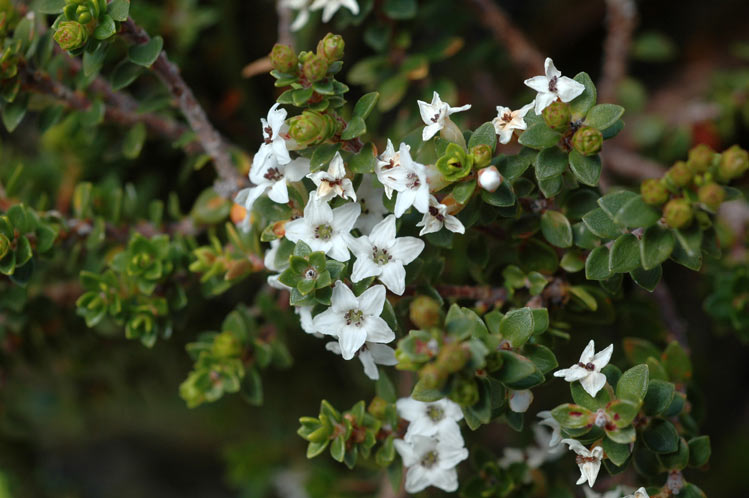
- In the Australian National Botanic Gardens

Conservation status
- Least Concern (IUCN 3.1)

Scientific classification
- Kingdom: Plantae
- Clade: Tracheophytes
- Clade: Angiosperms
- Clade: Eudicots
- Clade: Asterids
- Order: Ericales
- Family: Ericaceae
- Genus: Epacris
- Species: E. heteronema

Binomial name
- Epacris heteronema Labill.

= Epacris heteronema =

Species of flowering plant

Epacris heteronema is a species of flowering plant in the heath family Ericaceae and is endemic to Tasmania. It is an erect shrub with many branches, that typically grows to a height of 0.6–6 m (2 ft 0 in – 19 ft 8 in). Its leaves are egg-shaped with an often heart-shaped base and a sharply-pointed tip. The flowers are arranged singly in a few leaf axils near the ends of the branches and are white and tube-shaped, with lobes about the same length as the petal tube.

Epacris heteronema was first formally described in 1805 by Jacques Labillardière in his Novae Hollandiae Plantarum Specimen.

This epacris grows in heath and is widely distributed in the south and south-west of Tasmania.
