= Epacris pinoidea =

Scientific classification
- Kingdom: Plantae
- Clade: Tracheophytes
- Clade: Angiosperms
- Clade: Eudicots
- Clade: Asterids
- Order: Ericales
- Family: Ericaceae
- Genus: Epacris
- Species: E. pinoidea

Binomial name
- Epacris pinoidea Crowden & Menadue

Species of flowering plant

Epacris pinoidea is a species of flowering plant in the heath family Ericaceae and is endemic to a small area of eastern New South Wales. It is an erect to semi-erect shrub with flat, oblong to elliptic or lance-shaped leaves and white, tube-shaped flowers.

== Description ==
Epacris pinoidea is a semi-erect to erect shrub that typically grows to a height of up to 50 cm (20 in), rarely higher and has glabrous, reddish-brown young branches that turn brown with age and have prominent leaf scars. The leaves are oblong to elliptic or lance-shaped with the narrower end towards the base, 8–14 mm (0.31–0.55 in) long and 3–4 mm (0.12–0.16 in) wide on a petiole less than 1 mm (0.039 in) long. The flowers are arranged in small clusters near the ends of the branches, each flower on a pedicel about 1.0–1.5 mm (0.039–0.059 in) long, with egg-shaped, cream-coloured bracts near the base. The sepals are oblong to egg-shaped, 3–4 mm (0.12–0.16 in) long. The petals are white and joined at the base, forming a bell-shaped tube 5–7 mm (0.20–0.28 in) long with lobes 3–4 mm (0.12–0.16 in) long. The style is 5.0–6.8 mm (0.20–0.27 in) long and is slightly longer than the anthers. Flowering occurs in January and February.

== Taxonomy and naming ==
Epacris pinoidea was first formally described in 1996 by Ron Crowden and Yvonne Menadue in the Annals of Botany based on plant material collected in the Blue Mountains in 1975. The specific epithet (pinoidea) refers to the resemblance of young plants to a pine seedling.

== Distribution and habitat ==
This epacris grows in sandstone rock fissures in forest on the ranges from the Grose River to the Budawang Range of eastern New South Wales.
