= Epacris limbata =

Conservation status
- Critically endangered (EPBC Act)

Scientific classification
- Kingdom: Plantae
- Clade: Tracheophytes
- Clade: Angiosperms
- Clade: Eudicots
- Clade: Asterids
- Order: Ericales
- Family: Ericaceae
- Genus: Epacris
- Species: E. limbata

Binomial name
- Epacris limbata K.J.Williams & F.Duncan

Species of flowering plant

Epacris limbata, commonly known as bordered heath or border heath, is a species of flowering plant in the heath family Ericaceae and is endemic to a restricted area of Tasmania. It is an erect shrub with narrowly heart-shaped or broadly egg-shaped, stem-clasping, sharply-pointed leaves and tube-shaped white flowers clustered along the ends of branches.

== Description ==
Epacris limbata is a shrub that typically grows to a height of up to 3 m (9.8 ft) and has long, slender branches. Its leaves are narrowly heart-shaped or broadly egg-shaped, 4–8 mm (0.16–0.31 in) long, 3.0–5.6 mm (0.12–0.22 in) wide and sharply pointed, with a stem-clasping base. The flowers are arranged singly in leaf axils, in clusters near the ends of branches with hairy bracts and five sepals at the base. The petals are white, joined at the base to form a bell-shaped tube 2.2–3.5 mm (0.087–0.138 in) long with five broadly egg-shaped lobes 3.0–5.8 mm (0.12–0.23 in) long. The style is enclosed in the petal tube but the anthers extend beyond its end.

== Taxonomy and naming ==
Epacris limbata was first formally described in 1991 by Kyle Joseph Williams and Fred Duncan in Aspects of Tasmanian Botany - a tribute to Winifred Curtis from specimens collected near the Apsley River Gorge in the Douglas-Apsley National Park in 1987. The specific epithet (limbata) means "possessing a border".

== Distribution and habitat ==
Bordered heath usually grows in the ecotone between marshland and heathy forest and is restricted to a small part of the catchments of the Apsley and Swan Rivers south-west of Bicheno in eastern Tasmania.

== Conservation status ==
Epacris limbata is listed as "critically endangered" under the Australian Government Environment Protection and Biodiversity Conservation Act 1999 and as "endangered" under the Tasmanian Government Threatened Species Protection Act 1995. The main threats to the species include inappropriate fire regimes and disease caused by Phytophthora cinnamomi.
