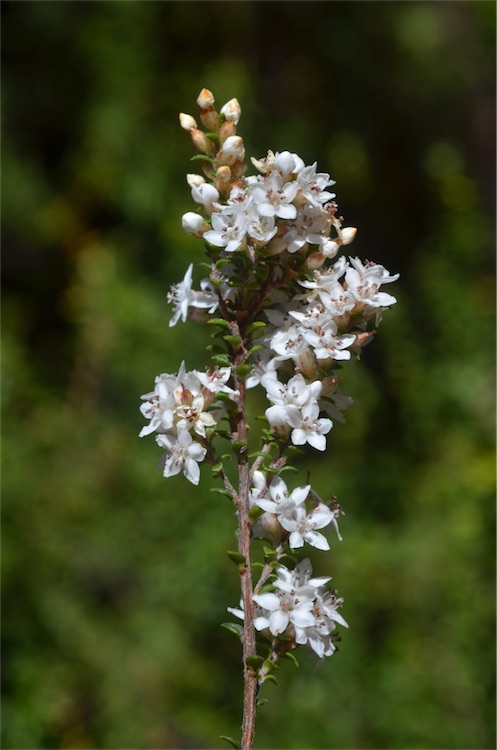
- In the Royal Tasmanian Botanical Gardens

Conservation status
- Critically endangered (EPBC Act)

Scientific classification
- Kingdom: Plantae
- Clade: Tracheophytes
- Clade: Angiosperms
- Clade: Eudicots
- Clade: Asterids
- Order: Ericales
- Family: Ericaceae
- Genus: Epacris
- Species: E. graniticola

Binomial name
- Epacris graniticola Crowden

= Epacris graniticola =

Species of flowering plant

Epacris graniticola, commonly known as granite heath, is a species of flowering plant in the heath family Ericaceae and is endemic to Tasmania. It is an erect shrub with egg-shaped leaves and tube-shaped white flowers mostly clustered near the ends of branches.

== Description ==
Epacris graniticola is a shrub that typically grows to a height of up to 1.5 m (4 ft 11 in) and has many erect, hairy stems, the old stems more or less leafless. Its leaves are egg-shaped, 2.0–5.5 mm (0.079–0.217 in) long and 1.3–2.9 mm (0.051–0.114 in) wide on a petiole less than 1 mm (0.039 in) long. The flowers are arranged singly in leaf axils, clustered near the ends of branches with egg-shaped bracts at the base, the five sepals white or pink streaked, lance-shaped and 2.0–3.9 mm (0.079–0.154 in) long. The petals are white, joined at the base to form a slightly bell-shaped tube 3–4 mm (0.12–0.16 in) long with five lobes 3.5–4.0 mm (0.14–0.16 in) long, the style and anthers extending beyond the end of the tube.

== Taxonomy and naming ==
Epacris graniticola was first formally described in 1995 by R.K.Crowden in the journal Muelleria from specimens he collected on Mount Cameron in 2003. The specific epithet (graniticola) means "granite dweller".

== Distribution and habitat ==
Granite heath is only known from a few populations in mountainous areas of north-east Tasmania, where it grows in moist places in the shade of granite outcrops.

== Conservation status ==
Epacris graniticola is listed as "critically endangered" under the Australian Government Environment Protection and Biodiversity Conservation Act 1999 and the Tasmanian Government Threatened Species Protection Act 1995. The main threats to the species are inappropriate fire regimes, disease caused by Phytophthora cinnamomi and mining activities.
