= Epacris navicularis =

Scientific classification
- Kingdom: Plantae
- Clade: Tracheophytes
- Clade: Angiosperms
- Clade: Eudicots
- Clade: Asterids
- Order: Ericales
- Family: Ericaceae
- Genus: Epacris
- Species: E. navicularis

Binomial name
- Epacris navicularis Jarman

Species of flowering plant

Epacris navicularis is a species of flowering plant in the heath family Ericaceae and is endemic to south-western Tasmania. It is a shrub with crowded, overlapping egg-shaped leaves arranged in five rows, and bell-shaped white flowers crowded in upper leaf axils.

== Description ==
Epacris navicularis is a shrub that typically grows to a height of up to 50 cm (20 in) and has softly-hairy young stems. Its leaves are crowded, overlapping and egg-shaped, arranged in five columns along the branches, 2.5–3.5 mm (0.098–0.138 in) long and about 1 mm (0.039 in) wide on a short, broad petiole. The flowers are arranged singly in leaf axils forming a cluster near the ends of branches. The five sepals are broadly lance-shaped to egg-shaped, 3.0–3.5 mm (0.12–0.14 in) long and the petals are white, joined at the base to form a bell-shaped tube with lobes that are longer than the petal tube. Flowering occurs from January to March.

== Taxonomy and naming ==
Epacris navicularis was first formally described in 1978 by S. Jean Jarman in the Papers and Proceedings of the Royal Society of Tasmania from specimens collected on Mount Sprent (near the Serpentine Dam) in 1977. The specific epithet (navicularis) means "boat-shaped".

== Distribution and habitat ==
This epacris grows in exposed alpine heathland in south-western Tasmania, including on Frenchmans Cap.
