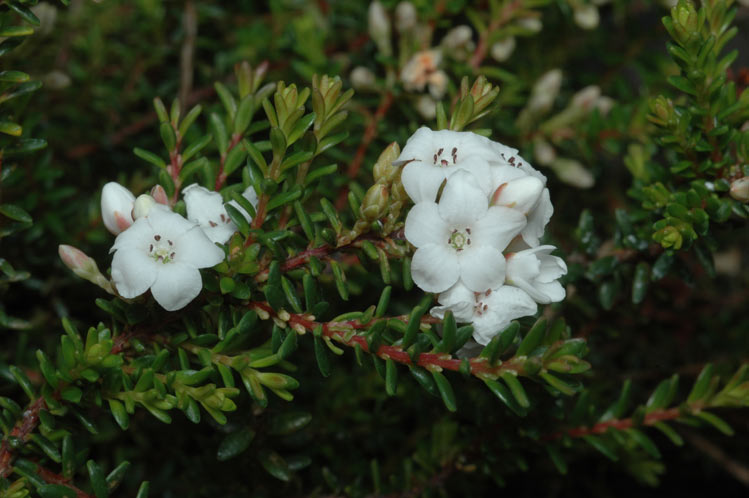
- In the Australian National Botanic Gardens

Scientific classification
- Kingdom: Plantae
- Clade: Tracheophytes
- Clade: Angiosperms
- Clade: Eudicots
- Clade: Asterids
- Order: Ericales
- Family: Ericaceae
- Genus: Epacris
- Species: E. muelleri

Binomial name
- Epacris muelleri Sond.

= Epacris muelleri =

Species of flowering plant

Epacris muelleri, commonly known as Mueller's heath, is a species of flowering plant in the heath family Ericaceae and is endemic to eastern New South Wales. It is an erect, or weak straggling shrub with more or less glabrous branchlets, elliptic leaves and white or cream-coloured, tube-shaped flowers.

== Description ==
Epacris muelleri is an erect, or weak straggling shrub with branches 5–30 cm (2.0–11.8 in) long, its stems with obvious leaf scars, and its branchlets more or less glabrous. The leaves are thick, blunt and elliptic, 1.7–4.5 mm (0.067–0.177 in) long and 0.5–2.2 mm (0.020–0.087 in) wide on a petiole 0.3–0.8 mm (0.012–0.031 in) long. The flowers are arranged in leafy clusters on a peduncle 1.5–4 mm (0.059–0.157 in) long, and are 5.0–6.5 mm (0.20–0.26 in) wide, with broad, pointed bracts at the base. The sepals are 2.0–2.8 mm (0.079–0.110 in) long. The petals are white or cream-coloured, joined at the base, forming a bell-shaped tube 1.5–2.1 mm (0.059–0.083 in) long with lobes 2.4–3.6 mm (0.094–0.142 in) long. The anthers are visible at the top of the petal tube. Flowering occurs from October to December, and the fruit is a capsule about 2 mm (0.079 in) long.

== Taxonomy ==
Epacris muelleri was first formally described in 1854 by Otto Wilhelm Sonder in the journal Linnaea: ein Journal für die Botanik in ihrem ganzen Umfange, oder Beiträge zur Pflanzenkunde based on plant material collected in the Blue Mountains.

== Distribution and habitat ==
This epacris grows with scrub or heath vegetation in sheltered places on damp sandstone rock faces in the Blue Mountains and Wollemi National Park.
