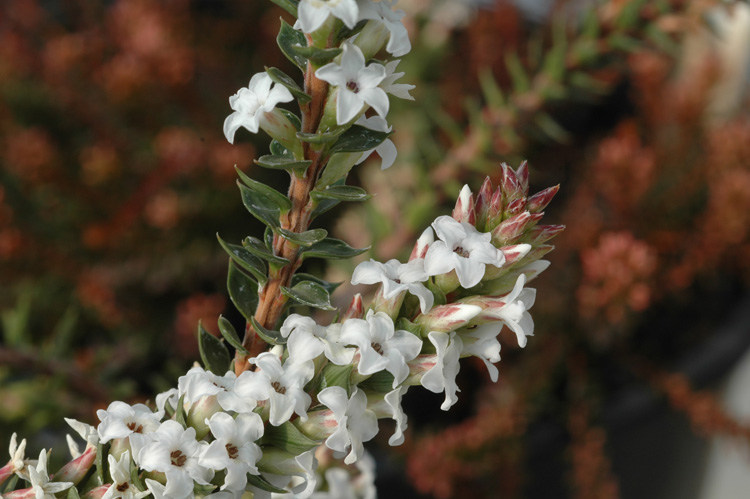
- In the Australian National Botanic Gardens

Scientific classification
- Kingdom: Plantae
- Clade: Tracheophytes
- Clade: Angiosperms
- Clade: Eudicots
- Clade: Asterids
- Order: Ericales
- Family: Ericaceae
- Genus: Epacris
- Species: E. stuartii

Binomial name
- Epacris stuartii Stapf

Synonyms
- Epacris heteronema var. planifolia Benth.

= Epacris stuartii =

Species of flowering plant

Epacris stuartii is a species of flowering plant in the heath family Ericaceae and is endemic to Tasmania. It was first formally described in 1910 by Otto Stapf and the description was published in the Bulletin of Miscellaneous Information.
