= List of rare flora of the Esperance Plains region =

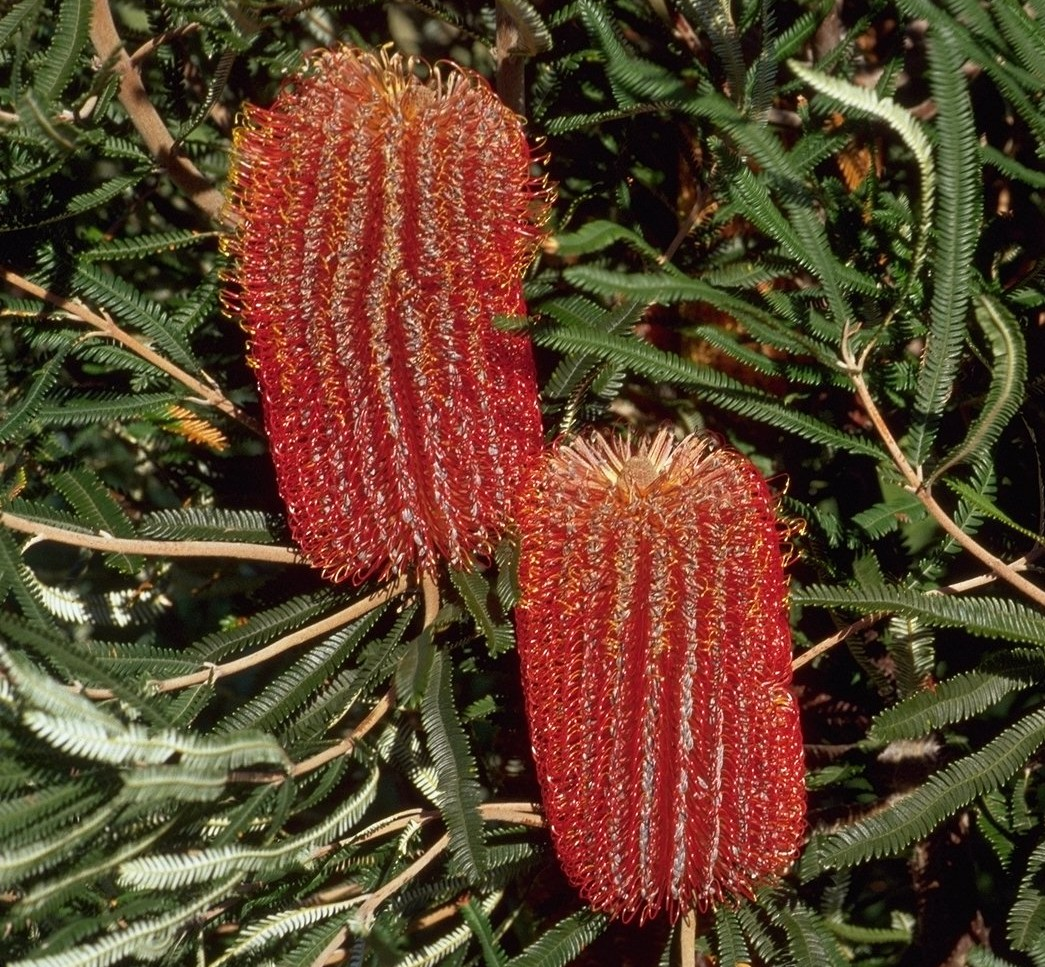
The endangered Banksia brownii (Feather-leaved Banksia) occurs in the Esperance Plains region

This is a list of endangered flora of the Esperance Plains region, a biogeographic region in southern Western Australia. It includes all taxa that occur in the region, and that have been classified as "R: Declared Rare Flora - Extant Taxa" or "X: Declared Rare Flora - Presumed Extinct Taxa" under the Department of Environment and Conservation's Declared Rare and Priority Flora List, and are hence gazetted as endangered extant flora under the Wildlife Conservation Act 1950.

There are 72 endangered taxa. Acacia prismifolia is presumed extinct. The other 71 are believed extant:

- Acacia awestoniana
- Acacia rhamphophylla
- Acacia trulliformis
- Adenanthos dobagii (Fitzgerald Woollybush)
- Adenanthos ellipticus (Oval-leaf Adenanthos)
- Adenanthos pungens subsp. pungens
- Adenanthos velutinus (Velvet Woollybush)
- Andersonia axilliflora (Giant Andersonia)
- Anigozanthos bicolor subsp. minor
- Banksia anatona
- Banksia brownii (Feather-leaved Banksia)
- Banksia montana
- Banksia pseudoplumosa
- Banksia verticillata (Albany Banksia)
- Beyeria sp. Bandalup Hill
- Boronia clavata
- Caladenia bryceana subsp. bryceana
- Chamelaucium sp. Hamersley
- Chordifex abortivus
- Conostylis lepidospermoides (Sedge Conostylis)
- Conostylis misera (Grass Conostylis)
- Coopernookia georgei (Mauve Coopernookia)
- Darwinia carnea (Mogumber Bell)
- Darwinia collina (Yellow Mountain Bell)
- Darwinia meeboldii (Cranbrook Bell)
- Darwinia oxylepis (Gilliam's Bell)
- Darwinia sp. Stirling Range
- Darwinia squarrosa (Pink Mountain Bell)
- Darwinia wittwerorum
- Daviesia glossosema
- Daviesia megacalyx
- Daviesia obovata
- Daviesia pseudaphylla
- Deyeuxia drummondii (Drummond Grass)
- Drakaea confluens ms
- Dryandra ionthocarpa subsp. ionthocarpa
- Eremophila ciliata (Archer's Eremophila)
- Eremophila denticulata subsp. denticulata ms
- Eremophila subteretifolia ms
- Eucalyptus burdettiana (Burdett Gum)
- Eucalyptus coronata (Crowned Mallee)
- Eucalyptus insularis (Twin Peak Island Mallee)
- Eucalyptus merrickiae (Goblet Mallee)
- Eucalyptus purpurata
- Eucalyptus steedmanii (Steedman's Gum)

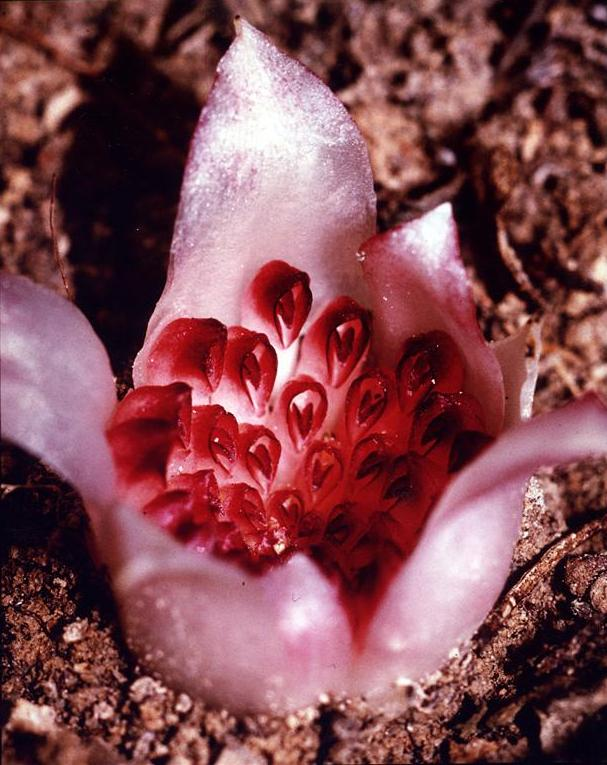
Rhizanthella gardneri (Underground Orchid)

- Gastrolobium luteifolium
- Grevillea infundibularis (Fan-leaf Grevillea)
- Grevillea maxwellii
- Hibbertia priceana
- Kunzea similis
- Lambertia echinata subsp. echinata
- Latrobea obovata ms
- Isopogon uncinatus
- Lambertia fairallii (Fairall's Honeysuckle)
- Lepidium aschersonii (Spiny Peppercress)
- Leucopogon gnaphalioides
- Marianthus mollis (Hairy-fruited Billardiera)
- Myoporum cordifolium
- Orthrosanthus muelleri
- Persoonia micranthera (Small-flowered Snottygobble)
- Rhizanthella gardneri (Underground Orchid)
- Ricinocarpos trichophorus
- Scaevola macrophylla
- Sphenotoma drummondii (Mountain Paper-heath)
- Stachystemon vinosus
- Stylidium galioides (Yellow Mountain Triggerplant)
- Thelymitra psammophila (Sandplain Sun Orchid)
- Verticordia carinata
- Verticordia crebra
- Verticordia helichrysantha (Barrens Featherflower)
- Verticordia pityrhops
- Xyris exilis
