= Acacia prismifolia =

Conservation status
- Critically endangered (EPBC Act)

Scientific classification
- Kingdom: Plantae
- Clade: Tracheophytes
- Clade: Angiosperms
- Clade: Eudicots
- Clade: Rosids
- Order: Fabales
- Family: Fabaceae
- Subfamily: Caesalpinioideae
- Clade: Mimosoid clade
- Genus: Acacia
- Species: A. prismifolia

Binomial name
- Acacia prismifolia E.Pritz.

Species of legume

Acacia prismifolia is a shrub of the genus Acacia and the subgenus Plurinerves that is endemic to a small area of south western Australia. It was once thought to be extinct until a specimen was found in 2018.

== Description ==
The rounded shrub typically grows to a height of 0.15 to 0.5 metres (0.5 to 1.6 ft) and has densely villous branchlets with persistent linear to linear-triangular shaped stipules that are 1 to 1.5 mm (0.039 to 0.059 in) in length. Like most species of Acacia it has phyllodes rather than true leaves. The evergreen and slightly curved phyllodes have a trigonous cross-section and have a length of 5 to 9 mm (0.20 to 0.35 in) and a wisth of 1 to 2 mm (0.039 to 0.079 in) with four nerves where the central nerve is slightly raised. When it blooms it produces simple inflorescences that are found crowded toward the ends of the branchlets and have spherical flower-heads with a diameter of 3 to 4 mm (0.12 to 0.16 in) and contain 9 to 10 yellow coloured flowers.

== Taxonomy ==
The species was first formally described by the botanist Ernst Georg Pritzel in 1904 as a part of the work by Pritzel and Diels, Fragmenta Phytographiae Australiae occidentalis. Beitrage zur Kenntnis der Pflanzen Westaustraliens, ihrer Verbreitung und ihrer Lebensverhaltnisse as published in the journal Botanische Jahrbücher für Systematik, Pflanzengeschichte und Pflanzengeographie. It was reclassified by Leslie Pedley in 2003 as Racosperma prismifolium then transferred back to genus Acacia in 2005. It belongs to the Acacia sulcata group of wattles and is thought to be most closely related to Acacia brachyphylla.

== Rediscovery ==
Last specimen was recorded in the 1933, and presumed to have been extinct. In 2018 the plant was collected by botanist Libby Sandiford near Cranbrook, seeds from A. prismifolia have been collected for protection and propagation by Threatened Flora Seed Centre in Perth.

== Distribution ==
It is native to an area in the Great Southern region of Western Australia where it was found on rocky slopes as a part of dense shrubland communities. The type specimen was collected by Ludwig Diels in 1901 near the Stirling Range.

== See also ==
- List of Acacia species
