= Acacia octonervia =

Scientific classification
- Kingdom: Plantae
- Clade: Tracheophytes
- Clade: Angiosperms
- Clade: Eudicots
- Clade: Rosids
- Order: Fabales
- Family: Fabaceae
- Subfamily: Caesalpinioideae
- Clade: Mimosoid clade
- Genus: Acacia
- Species: A. octonervia

Binomial name
- Acacia octonervia R.S.Cowan & Maslin
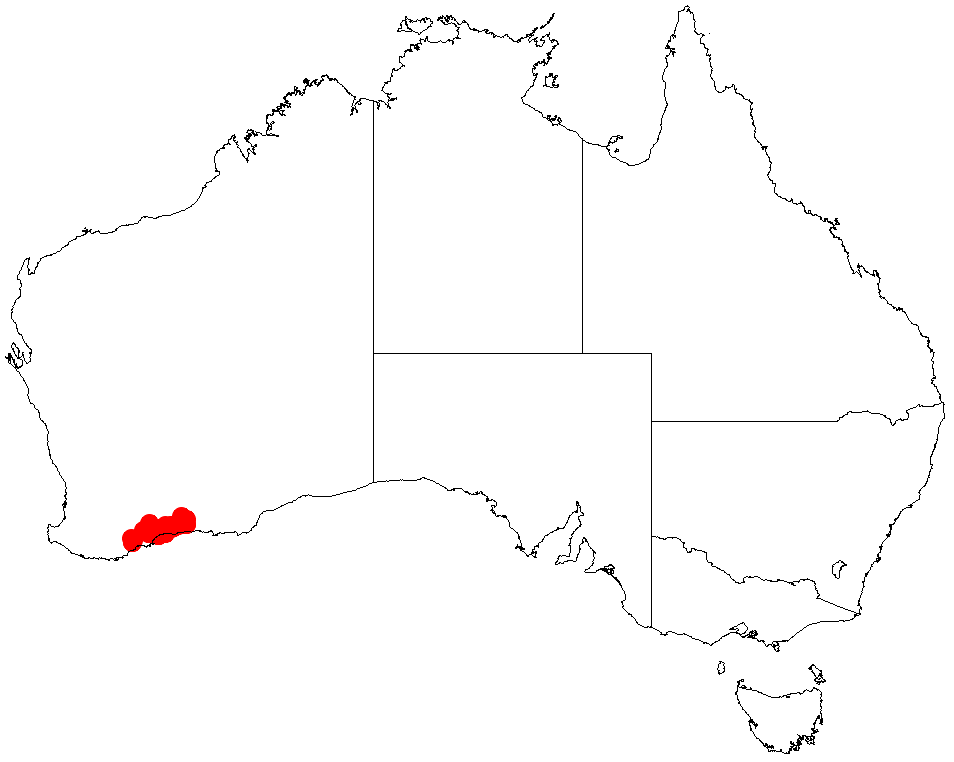
- Occurrence data from AVH

Synonyms
- Acacia aff. sulcata [P66] (B.R.Maslin 3878); Racosperma octonervium (R.S.Cowan & Maslin) Pedley

Species of legume

Acacia octonervia is a species of flowering plant in the family Fabaceae, and is endemic to the south of Western Australia. It is a glabrous, spreading shrub with brownish red branchlets, erect, straight or weakly curved phyllodes, spherical heads of light golden yellow flowers and narrowly oblong, wavy, leathery pods.

== Description ==
Acacia octonervia is a glabrous, spreading shrub that typically grows to a height of 10–50 cm (3.9–19.7 in) and has sometimes shiny brownish red branchlets. Its phyllodes are erect, terete, straight or weakly curved 10–20 mm (0.39–0.79 in) long, 1.0–1.5 mm (0.039–0.059 in) wide, rigid and dark green with eight raised veins. There is an inconspicuous gland 4–10 mm (0.16–0.39 in) above the pulvinus and narrowly triangular stipules at the base of the phyllodes. The flowers are arranged in one or two spherical heads in axils, on peduncles commonly 7–12 mm (0.28–0.47 in) long, each head 3–4 mm (0.12–0.16 in) in diameter, with about 20 light golden yellow flowers. Flowering mainly occurs from August to November, and the pods are narrowly oblong, wavy, up to 25 mm (0.98 in) long, about 3 mm (0.12 in) wide, leathery and slightly shiny. The seeds are egg-shaped to widely elliptic, 2.0–2.5 mm (0.079–0.098 in) long, slightly glossy and brown with a white aril near the end.

== Taxonomy ==
Acacia octonervia was first formally described in 1993 by Richard Cowan and Bruce Maslin in the journal Nuytsia from specimens collected by Maslin in the Whoogarup Range in the Fitzgerald River National Park in 1975. The specific epithet (octonervia) means 'eight-veined', referring to the phyllodes.

This wattle is closely related to A. sulcata which has phyllodes with six or seven veins and heads of 10 to 15 flowers.

== Distribution and habitat ==
This species of wattle grows on undulating plains and on lateritic rises in gravelly sandy, sandy-clay or loamy soils in dense low heath, open mallee and open dwarf scrub. It is restricted to an area between the Fitzgerald River and Young River, with an outlier near Boxwood Hill about 100 km (62 mi) further west.

== See also ==
- List of Acacia species
