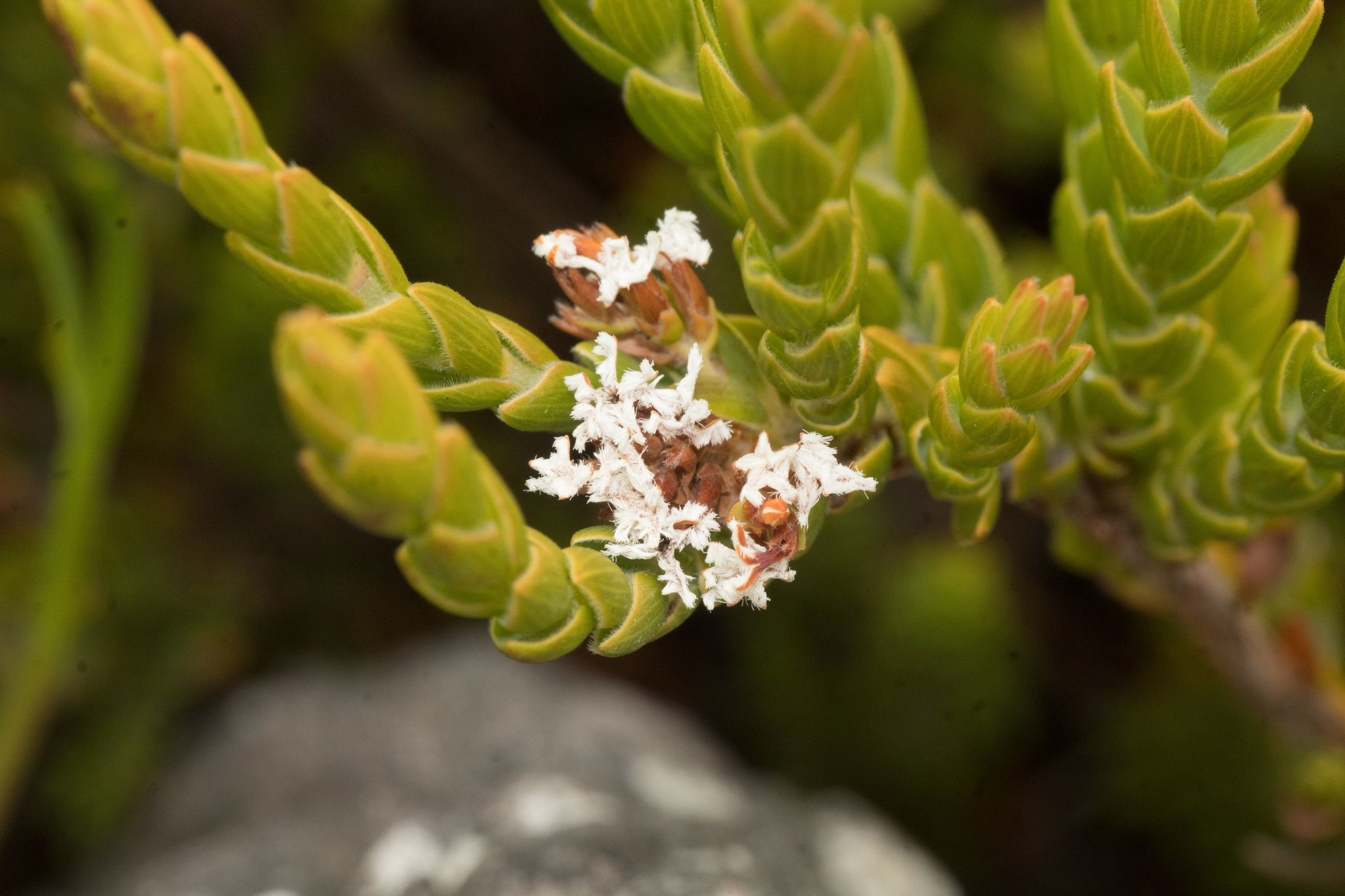
- In the Stirling Range National Park

Conservation status
- Declared rare (DEC)

Scientific classification
- Kingdom: Plantae
- Clade: Tracheophytes
- Clade: Angiosperms
- Clade: Eudicots
- Clade: Asterids
- Order: Ericales
- Family: Ericaceae
- Genus: Leucopogon
- Species: L. gnaphalioides

Binomial name
- Leucopogon gnaphalioides Stschegl.
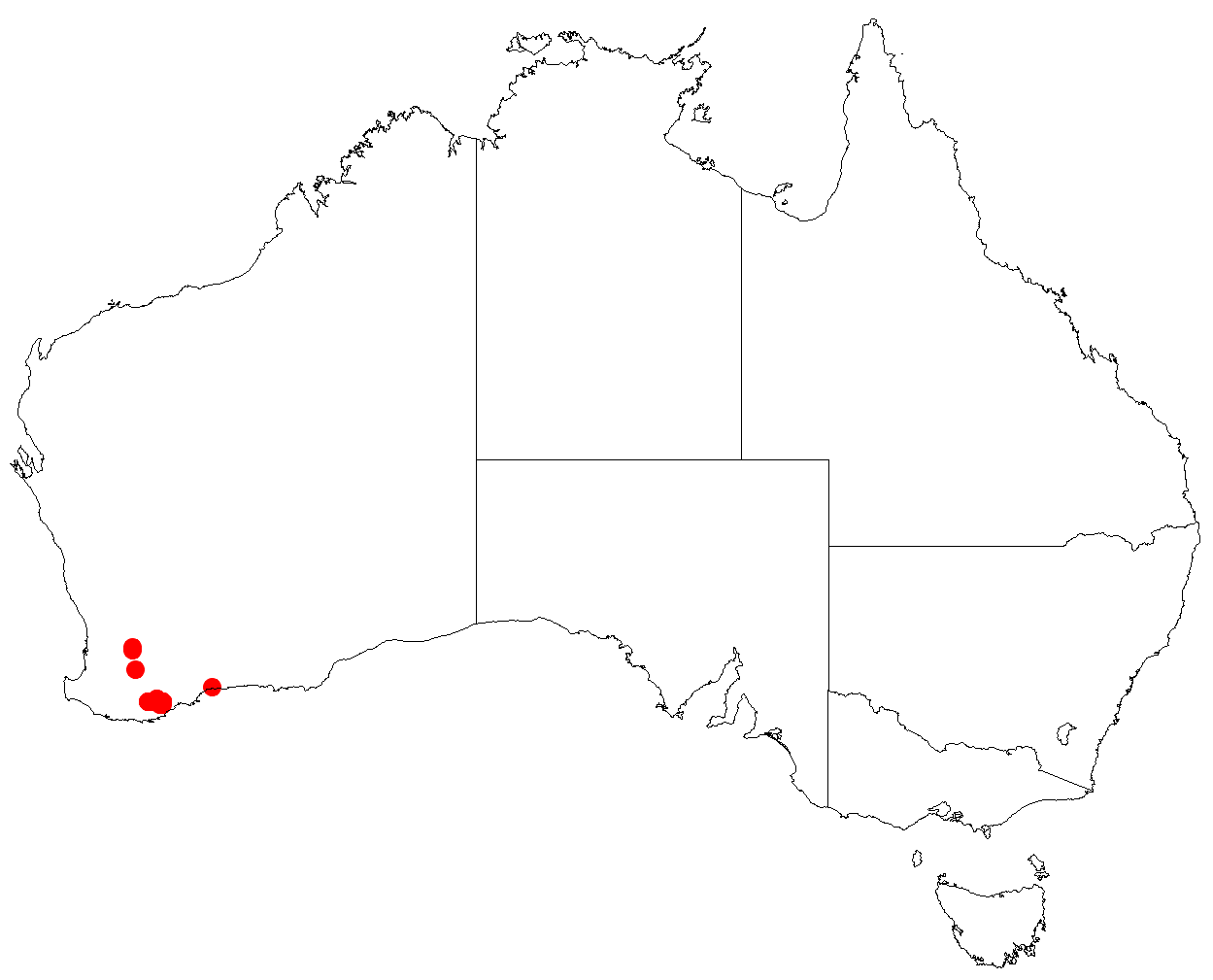
- Occurrence data from AVH

Synonyms
- Styphelia gnaphalioides (Stschegl.) F.Muell.

= Leucopogon gnaphalioides =

Species of shrub

Leucopogon gnaphalioides is a species of flowering plant in the heath family Ericaceae and is endemic to the south-west of Western Australia. It is a slender or sprawling shrub with crowded egg-shaped to lance-shaped leaves and spikes of tube-shaped white flowers on the ends of branches and in upper leaf axils.

== Description ==
Leucopogon gnaphalioides is a slender or sprawling shrub that typically grows to a height of 0.25–1 m (9.8 in – 3 ft 3.4 in). Its leaves are egg-shaped to lance-shaped, 6.0–8.5 mm (0.24–0.33 in) long with prominent striations. The flowers are arranged in short, dense spikes on the ends of branches or in upper leaf axils with bracts and bracteoles about half as long as the sepals. The sepals are about 3 mm (0.12 in) long and narrow, and the petals white, forming a tube about half the length of the sepals, the lobes longer than the petal tube.

== Taxonomy ==
Leucopogon gnaphalioides was first formally described in 1859 by Sergei Sergeyevich Sheglejev in the Bulletin de la Société impériale des naturalistes de Moscou from specimens collected by James Drummond. The specific epithet (gnaphalioides) means "Gnaphalium-like".

== Distribution and habitat ==
This leucopogon grows in shallow, rocky soils on rocky slopes and plateaus in the Esperance Plains and Mallee bioregions of south-western Western Australia.

== Conservation status ==
Leucopogon gnaphalioides is listed as "Threatened" by the Western Australian Government Department of Biodiversity, Conservation and Attractions, meaning that it is in danger of extinction.
