= Acacia trulliformis =

Conservation status
- Priority Four — Rare Taxa (DEC)

Scientific classification
- Kingdom: Plantae
- Clade: Tracheophytes
- Clade: Angiosperms
- Clade: Eudicots
- Clade: Rosids
- Order: Fabales
- Family: Fabaceae
- Subfamily: Caesalpinioideae
- Clade: Mimosoid clade
- Genus: Acacia
- Species: A. trulliformis

Binomial name
- Acacia trulliformis R.S.Cowan & Maslin
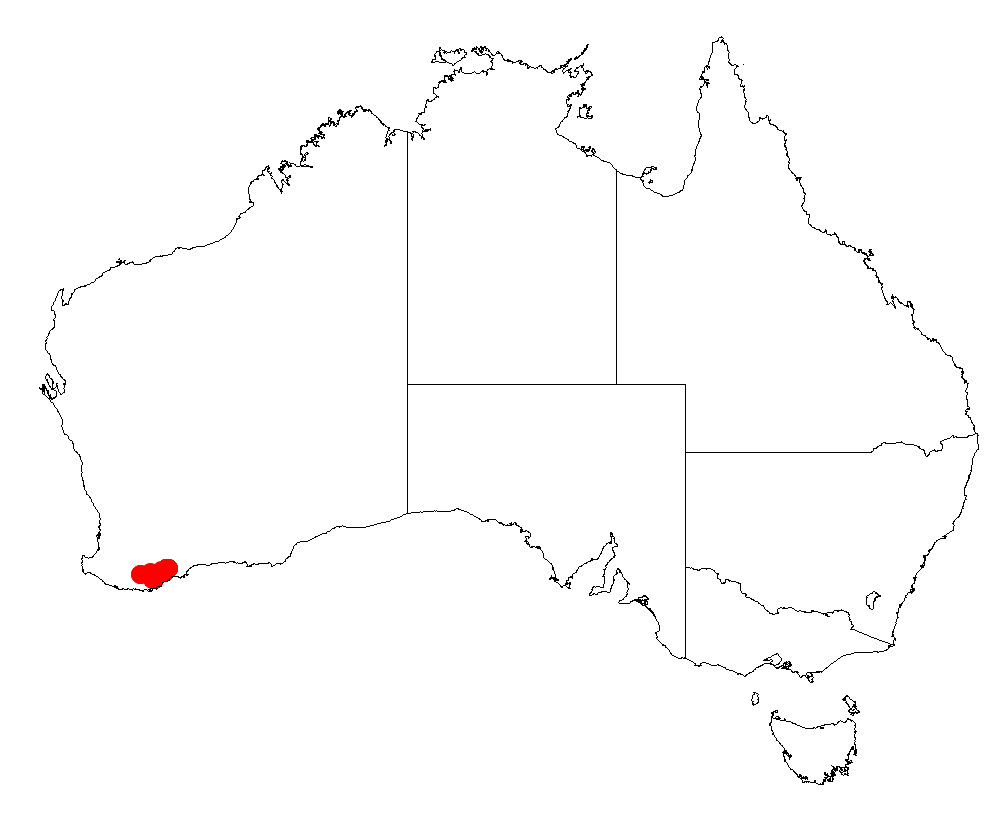
- Occurrence data from AVH

Species of legume

Acacia trulliformis is a shrub of the genus Acacia and the subgenus Plurinerves that is endemic to an area of south western Australia.

== Description ==
The spreading shrub typically grows to a height of 0.9 to 2.2 metres (3 to 7 ft) and has angled, hairy and resinous branchlets. Like most species of Acacia it has phyllodes rather than true leaves. The hairy phyllodes become glabrous with age are more or less asymmetric with an elliptic to oblong-elliptic shape with a length of 1.5 to 4.5 cm (0.59 to 1.77 in) and a width of 8 to 16 mm (0.31 to 0.63 in) and have two to four main longitudinal nerves. It blooms in September and produces yellow flowers. The inflorescences occur on one or two heads racemes along an axis that is 2 to 8 mm (0.079 to 0.315 in) in length with spherical to obloid shaped flower-heads with a diameter of 5 to 6 mm (0.20 to 0.24 in) containing 62 to 75 densely packed golden flowers. The hairy leathery seed pods that form after flowering have a narrowly oblong shape and are straight to S-shaped with a length of up to 3.5 cm (1.4 in) and a width of 5 to 6 mm (0.20 to 0.24 in). The subglossy dark brown seeds inside have an oblong-oval shape with a length of 3.5 to 4 mm (0.14 to 0.16 in) with a white subapical aril.

== Taxonomy ==
It belongs to the Acacia flavipila group and is thought to be closely related to Acacia loxophylla.

== Distribution ==
It is native to an area in the Great Southern region of Western Australia where it is found growing in sandy loam soils. The range of the plant extends from the south east of Ongerup down to around the Gordon Inlet in the south east where it is commonly situated on creek flats as a part of Eucalyptus occidentalis woodland communities.

== See also ==
- List of Acacia species
