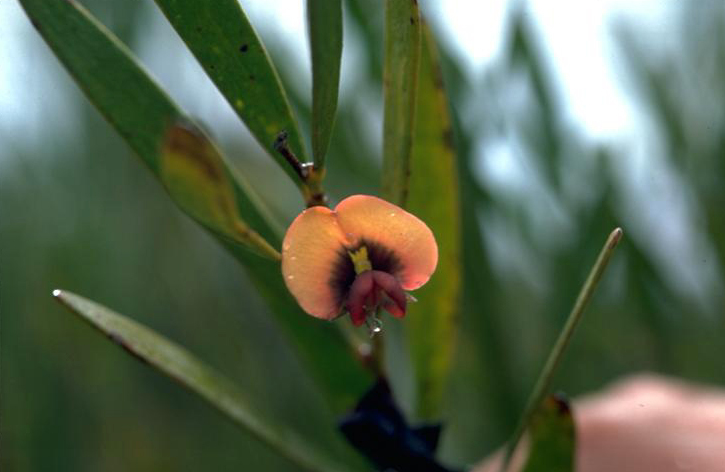
- Near Ravensthorpe

Conservation status
- Endangered (EPBC Act)

Scientific classification
- Kingdom: Plantae
- Clade: Tracheophytes
- Clade: Angiosperms
- Clade: Eudicots
- Clade: Rosids
- Order: Fabales
- Family: Fabaceae
- Subfamily: Faboideae
- Genus: Daviesia
- Species: D. megacalyx

Binomial name
- Daviesia megacalyx Crisp

= Daviesia megacalyx =

Species of flowering plant

Daviesia megacalyx is a species of flowering plant in the family Fabaceae and is endemic to a restricted part of the south-west of Western Australia. It is an erect, glabrous shrub with scattered, leathery, elliptic phyllodes and apricot-coloured and deep pink flowers.

== Description ==
Daviesia megacalyx is an erect, glabrous shrub that typically grows to a height of 0.7–1.6 m (2 ft 4 in – 5 ft 3 in). Its phyllodes are scattered, elliptic to narrowly egg-shaped with the narrower end towards the base, 40–80 mm (1.6–3.1 in) long, 5–12 mm (0.20–0.47 in) wide and leathery. The flowers are arranged in groups of one or two in leaf axils on a peduncle 1.0–2.5 mm (0.039–0.098 in) long, the rachis up to 2.5 mm (0.098 in) long, each flower on a pedicel 3–6 mm (0.12–0.24 in) long. The sepals are 3.5–5.0 mm (0.14–0.20 in) long and joined at the base, the lobes more or less similar, triangular and about 2.5 mm (0.098 in) long. The standard petal is broadly egg-shaped, about 11 mm (0.43 in) long and apricot with a maroon base and intensely yellow centre. The wings are about 8.5 mm (0.33 in) long and deep pink, and the keel about 6.5 mm (0.26 in) long and deep pink. Flowering occurs in August and September and the fruit is a flattened, leathery triangular pod 20–23 mm (0.79–0.91 in) long.

== Taxonomy and naming ==
Daviesia megacalyx was first formally described in 1995 by Michael Crisp in Australian Systematic Botany from specimens collected near Ravensthorpe in 1979. The specific epithet (megacalyx) means "large calyx", referring to the sepals.

== Distribution and habitat ==
This daviesia grows in mallee-heath and dense shrubland near Ravensthorpe in the Esperance Plains biogeographic region of south-western Western Australia.

== Conservation status ==
Daviesia megacalyx is listed as "endangered" under the Australian Government Environment Protection and Biodiversity Conservation Act 1999 and as "Threatened Flora (Declared Rare Flora — Extant)" by the Department of Biodiversity, Conservation and Attractions. The main threats to the species include inappropriate fire regimes, habitat loss and degradation by mining activities and dieback caused by Phytophthora.
