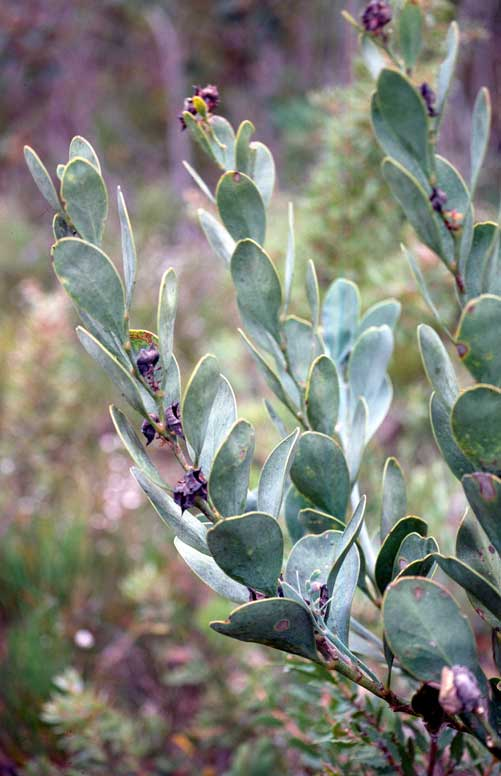
- Foliage of Daviesia obovata

Conservation status
- Endangered (EPBC Act)

Scientific classification
- Kingdom: Plantae
- Clade: Tracheophytes
- Clade: Angiosperms
- Clade: Eudicots
- Clade: Rosids
- Order: Fabales
- Family: Fabaceae
- Subfamily: Faboideae
- Genus: Daviesia
- Species: D. obovata

Binomial name
- Daviesia obovata Turcz.

= Daviesia obovata =

Paddle-leaf daviesia

Species of legume

Daviesia obovata, commonly known as paddle-leaf daviesia, is a species of flowering plant in the family Fabaceae and is endemic to the south-west of Western Australia. It is an erect, slender shrub with scattered egg-shaped phyllodes with the narrower end towards the base, and yellow flowers with pale green markings.

== Description ==
Daviesia obovata is an erect, slender shrub that typically grows to a height of 0.7–1.5 m (2 ft 4 in – 4 ft 11 in) and is glabrous. Its phyllodes are scattered, paddle-shaped to egg-shaped with the narrower end towards the base, mostly 55–90 mm (2.2–3.5 in) long and 18–45 mm (0.71–1.77 in) wide. The flowers are arranged in pairs or threes in leaf axils on a peduncle 0.5–2 mm (0.020–0.079 in) long, the rachis 5–7 mm (0.20–0.28 in) long, each flower on a pedicel 3–4 mm (0.12–0.16 in) long with bracts about 4 mm (0.16 in) long. The sepals are 7–8 mm (0.28–0.31 in) long and joined at the base, the lobes more or less equal in length. The standard petal is egg-shaped with a notched tip, about 9.5–11.0 mm (0.37–0.43 in) long, 14.5–16.0 mm (0.57–0.63 in) wide, and yellow and pale green. The wings are 9.0–10.5 mm (0.35–0.41 in) long and pale yellowish-green, and the keel is 7.5–9.0 mm (0.30–0.35 in) long and pale yellowish-green. Flowering occurs in October and the fruit is a flattened triangular pod 18.5–23 mm (0.73–0.91 in) long.

== Taxonomy ==
Daviesia obovata was first described in 1853 by Nikolai Turczaninow in the Bulletin de la Société Impériale des Naturalistes de Moscou. The specific epithet (obovata) means "inverted egg-shaped".

== Distribution and habitat ==
Paddle-leaf daviesia grows in heath with Eucalyptus marginata and is restricted to the eastern Stirling Range and the Barren Range in the Esperance Plains biogeographic region.

== Conservation status ==
This daviesia is listed as "endangered" species under the Australian Government Environment Protection and Biodiversity Conservation Act 1999 and as "Threatened" by the Western Australian Government Department of Parks and Wildlife, meaning that it is in danger of extinction. A major threat to the species is dieback due to Phytophthora cinnamomi.
