= Acacia brachyphylla =

Scientific classification
- Kingdom: Plantae
- Clade: Tracheophytes
- Clade: Angiosperms
- Clade: Eudicots
- Clade: Rosids
- Order: Fabales
- Family: Fabaceae
- Subfamily: Caesalpinioideae
- Clade: Mimosoid clade
- Genus: Acacia
- Species: A. brachyphylla

Binomial name
- Acacia brachyphylla Benth.
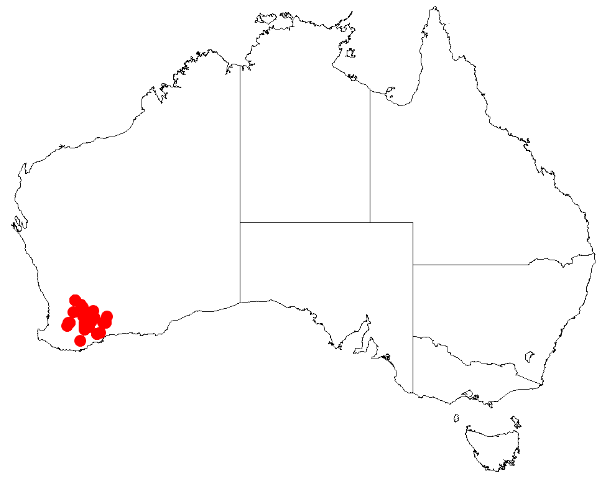
- Occurrence data from AVH

Synonyms
- Racosperma brachyphyllum (Benth.) Pedley

Species of legume

Habit near the caravan park in Kulin

Acacia brachyphylla is a species of flowering plant in the family Fabaceae and is endemic to the south-west of Western Australia. It is a spreading to upright subshrub with hairy branchlets, straight to curved, terete to flattened phyllodes, spherical heads of golden-yellow flowers, and wavy linear, thinly leathery to firmly papery pods.

== Description ==
Acacia brachyphylla is a spreading to upright subshrub that typically grows to a height of 20–30 cm (7.9–11.8 in) and has hairy branches. Its phyllodes are upright to erect, terete to flattened, 3–12 mm (0.12–0.47 in) long and about 1 mm (0.039 in) wide with 6 to 8 raised veins. There are narrowly triangular to tapering stipules up to 1.5 mm (0.059 in) long at the base of the phyllodes. The flowers are borne in one or two spherical heads in axils on peduncles 4–10 mm (0.16–0.39 in) long, each head 3–4 mm (0.12–0.16 in) long with 8 to 12 golden-yellow flowers. Flowering time depends on subspecies, and the fruit is a wavy, thinly leathery to firmly papery linear pod, up to 5 mm (0.20 in) long and 1.5–4.4 mm (0.059–0.173 in) wide with broadly egg-shaped, mottled brown to grey-brown seeds with an aril.

== Taxonomy ==
Acacia brachyphylla was first formally described in 1855 by George Bentham in the journal Linnaea from specimens collected by James Drummond.

In 1993, Richard Cowan and Bruce Maslin described two varieties of A. brachyphylla in the journal Nuytsia, and the names are accepted by the Australian Plant Census:

- Acacia brachyphylla Benth. var. brachyphylla has phyllodes usually 5–7 mm (0.20–0.28 in) long not downturned at the end, hairy pods not covered with a powdery bloom, and flowering between August and October.
- Acacia brachyphylla var. recurvata R.S.Cowan & Maslin has phyllodes usually 8–10 mm (0.31–0.39 in) long downturned at the end, and glabrous pods covered with a powdery bloom.

== Distribution ==
This species of wattle grows on sandplains in gravelly and sandy loam soils from near Tammin to near Jerramungup in the Avon Wheatbelt, Esperance Plains, Jarrah Forest and Mallee bioregions of south-western Western Australia.

== Conservation status ==
Acacia brachyphylla var. brachyphylla is listed as 'Not threatened' by the Government of Western Australia Department of Biodiversity, Conservation and Attractions, but var. recurvata is listed as 'Priority Three' meaning that it is poorly known and known from only a few locations but is not under imminent threat.

== See also ==
- List of Acacia species
