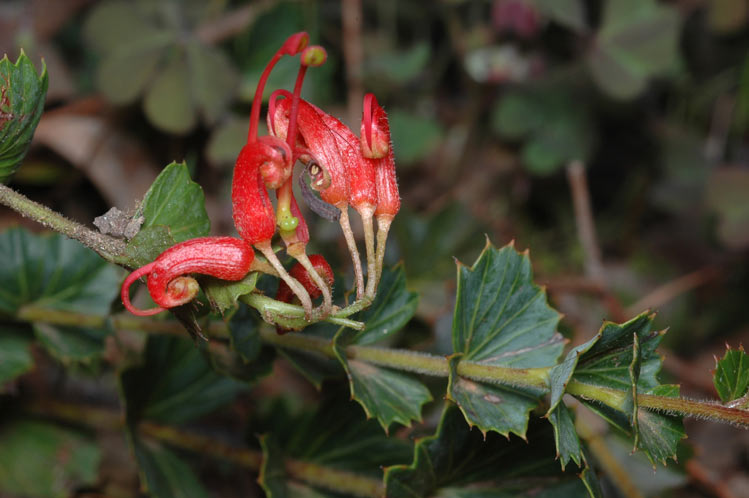
- In the Australian National Botanic Gardens

Conservation status
- Vulnerable (IUCN 3.1)

- Endangered (EPBC Act)

Scientific classification
- Kingdom: Plantae
- Clade: Embryophytes
- Clade: Tracheophytes
- Clade: Angiosperms
- Clade: Eudicots
- Order: Proteales
- Family: Proteaceae
- Genus: Grevillea
- Species: G. infundibularis

Binomial name
- Grevillea infundibularis A.S.George

= Grevillea infundibularis =

Species of shrub endemic to Western Australia

Grevillea infundibularis, commonly known as fan-leaf grevillea, is a species of flowering plant in the family Proteaceae and is endemic to a restricted area in the south of Western Australia. It is a spreading to low-lying shrub with egg-shaped to hemispherical leaves and clusters of four to eight bright red flowers.

== Description ==
Grevillea infundibularis is a spreading to low-lying shrub that typically grows to a height of 0.2–1 m (7.9 in – 3 ft 3.4 in) and has few branches. Its leaves are egg-shaped with the narrower end towards the base, to hemispherical, 10–60 mm (0.39–2.36 in) long and 10–40 mm (0.39–1.57 in) wide with an wedge-shaped to stem-clasping base, and a few to many (often eight) broad teeth on the ends. The flowers are bright red and erect, arranged in clusters of four to eight on the ends of branches and in leaf axils, the pistil 18–20 mm (0.71–0.79 in) long. Flowering occurs in most months and the fruit is an erect follicle 13–15 mm (0.51–0.59 in) long.

== Taxonomy ==
Grevillea infundibularis was first formally described in 1974 by Alex George in the journal Nuytsia from specimens he collected on Middle Mount Barren in 1970. The specific epithet (infundibularis) means "funnel-shaped", referring to the leaves.

== Distribution and habitat ==
Fan-leaf grevillea occurs in part of the Fitzgerald River National Park in the Esperance Plains bioregion where it grows in heathland among small to medium trees.

== Conservation status ==
Grevillea infundibularis is listed as 'Endangered' under the Australian Government Environment Protection and Biodiversity Conservation Act 1999 and as 'Threatened Flora (Declared Rare Flora — Extant)' by the Western Australian Government Department of Biodiversity, Conservation and Attractions. The main threat to the species is its restricted distribution but potentially also by inappropriate fire regimes and dieback caused by Phytophthora cinnamomi.
