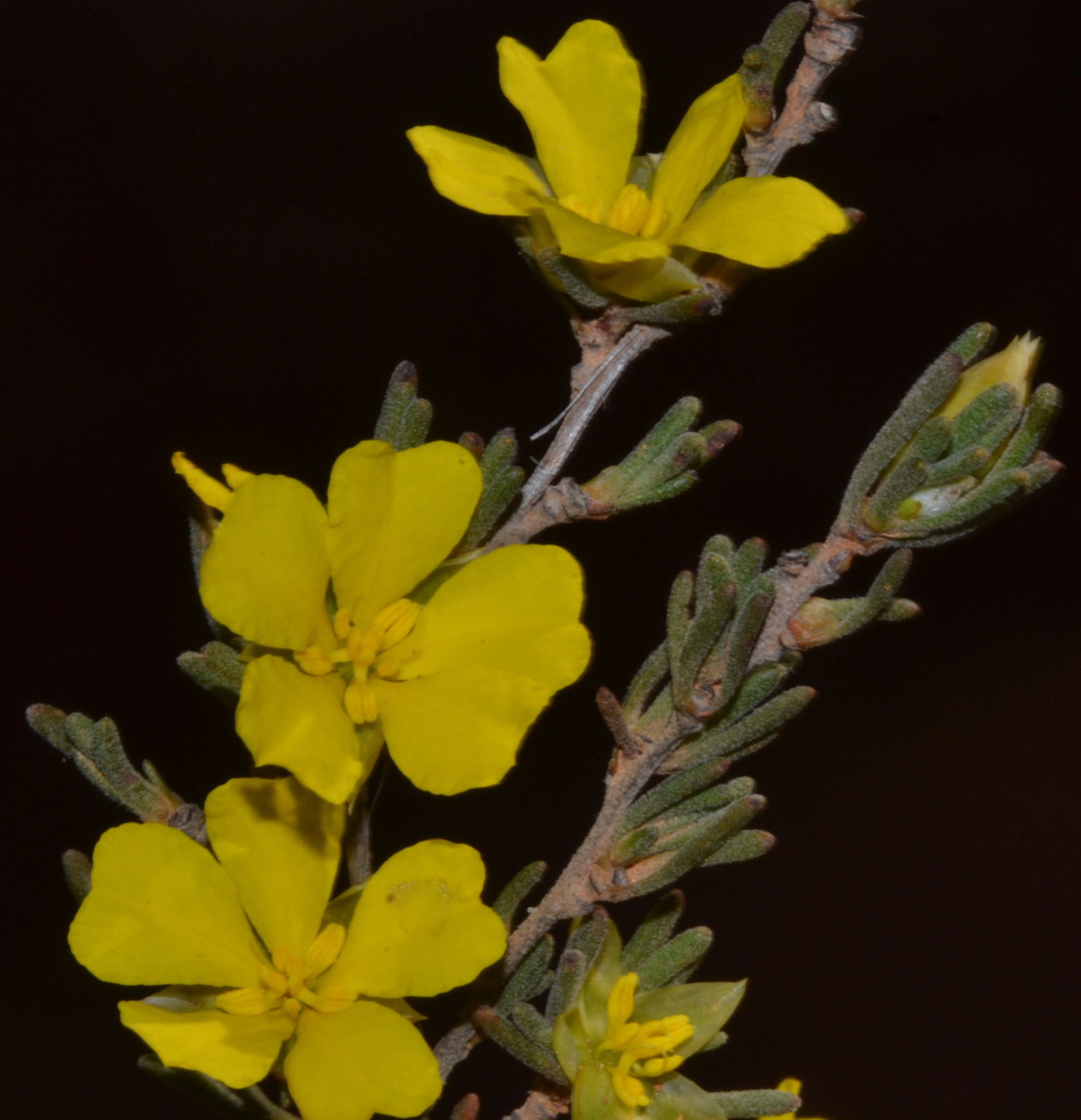

Conservation status
- Declared rare (DEC)

Scientific classification
- Kingdom: Plantae
- Clade: Tracheophytes
- Clade: Angiosperms
- Clade: Eudicots
- Order: Dilleniales
- Family: Dilleniaceae
- Genus: Hibbertia
- Species: H. priceana

Binomial name
- Hibbertia priceana J.R.Wheeler

= Hibbertia priceana =

Species of flowering plant

Hibbertia priceana is a species of flowering plant in the family Dilleniaceae and is endemic to the south-west of Western Australia. It is a dwarf, usually compact shrub with erect, narrow elliptic leaves and bright yellow flowers with eleven stamens, nine in three groups of three, around three glabrous carpels.

== Description ==
Hibbertia priceana is a dwarf, usually compact shrub that typically grows to a height of up to 15 cm (5.9 in), its branchlets covered with tangled hairs. The leaves are hairy, erect, narrow elliptic, 4.5–10.5 mm (0.18–0.41 in) long, 1.5–3 mm (0.059–0.118 in) wide and sessile. The flowers are sessile and arranged on the ends of short side shoots with up to three egg-shaped bracts 1.0–2.5 mm (0.039–0.098 in) long at the base. The five sepals are broadly elliptic, reddish-brown, 4–6 mm (0.16–0.24 in) long but the outer sepals differ in size and shape from the inner ones. The five petals are bright yellow, egg-shaped with the narrower end towards the base and 6–9 mm (0.24–0.35 in) long with a small notch at the tip. There are eleven stamens, in three groups of three and two free, arranged around three glabrous carpels that each contain a single ovule. Flowering occurs from June to August.

== Taxonomy ==
Hibbertia priceana was first formally described in 2002 by Judith R. Wheeler in the journal Nuytsia from specimens she collected near Ongerup in 2001. The specific epithet (priceana) honours John Price, who brought the species to the author's attention.

== Distribution and habitat ==
This hibbertia occurs in the Avon Wheatbelt, Esperance Plains and Mallee biogeographic regions, where it grows in mallee-heath on ridges.

== Conservation status ==
Hibbertia priceana is classified as "Threatened Flora (Declared Rare Flora — Extant)" by the Government of Western Australia Department of Biodiversity, Conservation and Attractions.

== See also ==
- List of Hibbertia species
