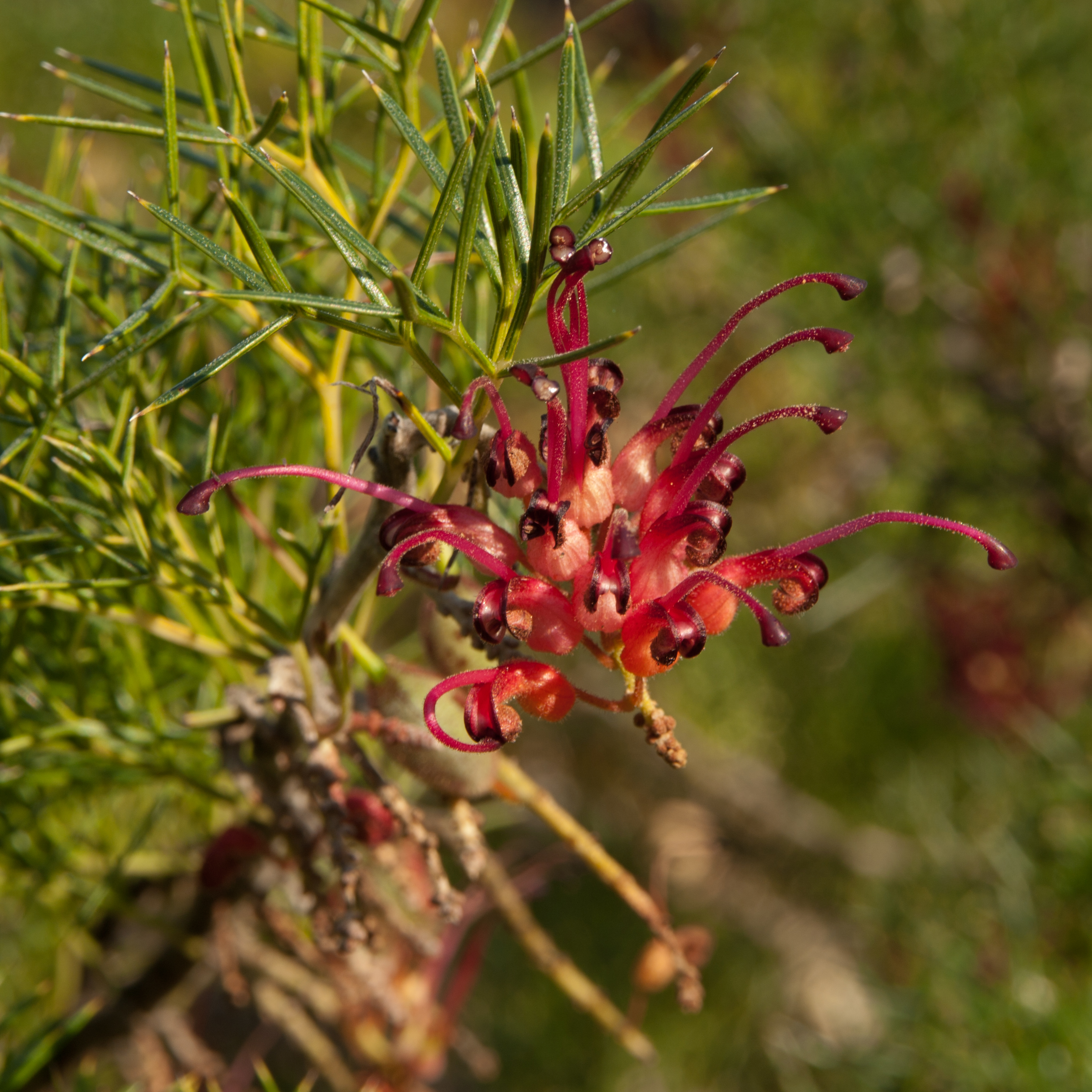

Conservation status
- Critically Endangered (IUCN 3.1)

- Declared rare (DEC)

Scientific classification
- Kingdom: Plantae
- Clade: Embryophytes
- Clade: Tracheophytes
- Clade: Angiosperms
- Clade: Eudicots
- Order: Proteales
- Family: Proteaceae
- Genus: Grevillea
- Species: G. maxwellii

Binomial name
- Grevillea maxwellii McGill.

Synonyms
- Grevillea asparagoides Meisn.

= Grevillea maxwellii =

Species of shrub endemic to Western Australia

Grevillea maxwellii is a species of flowering plant in the family Proteaceae and is endemic to the south west region of Western Australia. It is low-lying to spreading shrub divided leaves with linear, sharply-pointed lobes, and clusters of pinkish-orange to pinkish-red flowers with a deep pinkish red style.

== Description ==
Grevillea maxwellii is a low-lying to spreading shrub that typically grows to 0.2–1.2 m (7.9 in – 3 ft 11.2 in) high and up to 1.5 m (4 ft 11 in) wide. The leaves are 20–75 mm (0.79–2.95 in) long and divided with up to nine lobes, the lower ones usually further divided, the end lobes linear 6–30 mm (0.24–1.18 in) long, 0.8–1.4 mm (0.031–0.055 in) wide and sharply-pointed. The flowers are arranged in clusters on one side of a rachis 25–50 mm (0.98–1.97 in) long and are pinkish-orange to pinkish-red and hairy with a dark pinkish-red style, the pistil 20–24 mm (0.79–0.94 in) long. Flowering mainly occurs from September to November, and the fruit is a woolly-hairy follicle about 10 mm (0.39 in) long.

== Taxonomy ==
Grevillea maxwellii was first formally described by Donald McGillivray in 1986, his description published in New Names in Grevillea (Proteaceae) from specimens collected near the Salt River (now known as the Pallinup River) by George Maxwell. The specific epithet (maxwellii) honours the collector of the type specimens.

== Distribution and habitat ==
This grevillea grows in low heath, often in rocky places and is found in the catchment of the Pallinup River in the Esperance Plains bioregion of south-western Western Australia.

== Conservation status ==
Grevillea maxwellii is listed as threatened by the Western Australian Government Department of Biodiversity, Conservation and Attractions, meaning that they are in danger of extinction.
