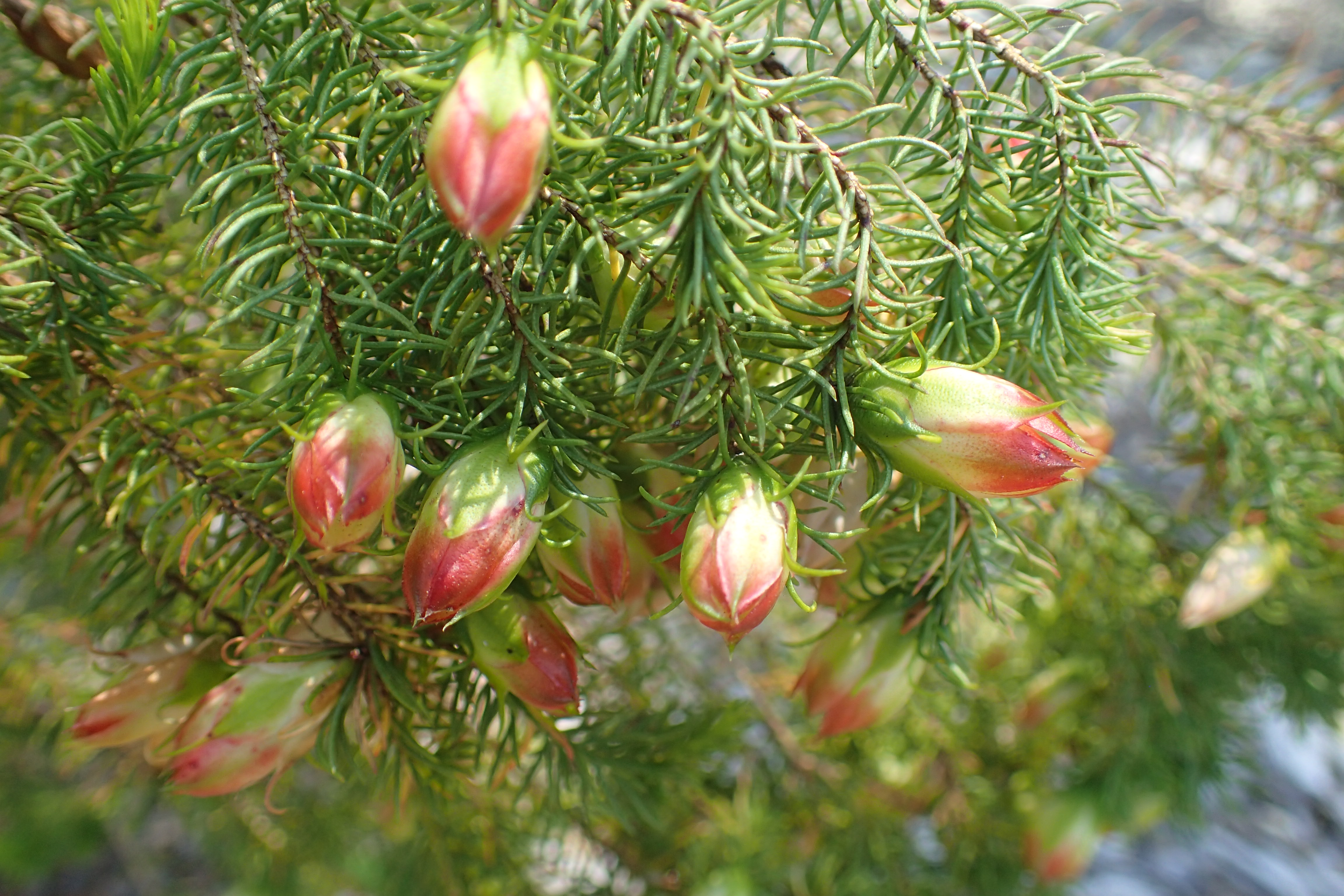
- In Kings Park Botanic Garden

Conservation status
- Endangered (EPBC Act)

Scientific classification
- Kingdom: Plantae
- Clade: Tracheophytes
- Clade: Angiosperms
- Clade: Eudicots
- Clade: Rosids
- Order: Myrtales
- Family: Myrtaceae
- Genus: Darwinia
- Species: D. wittwerorum

Binomial name
- Darwinia wittwerorum N.G.Marchant & Keighery
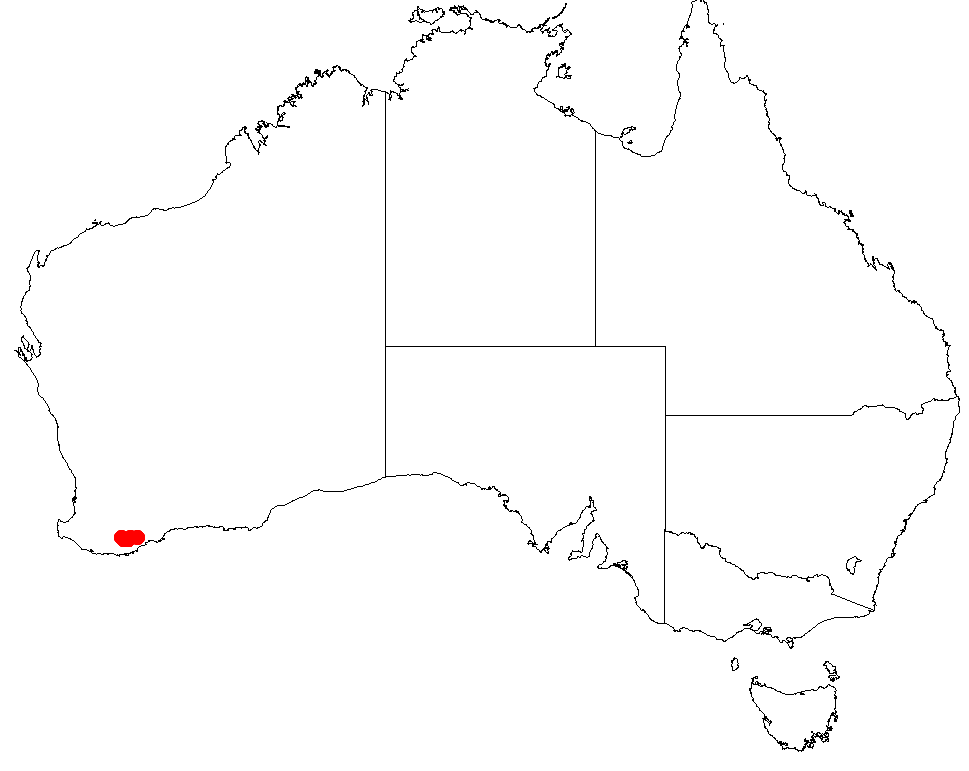
- Occurrence data from AVH

= Darwinia wittwerorum =

Species of flowering plant

Darwinia wittwerorum, commonly known as Wittwer's mountain bell, is a plant in the myrtle family Myrtaceae and is endemic to a small area in Western Australia. An erect, spindly shrub with fine leaves and hanging groups of flowers surrounded by leaf-like bracts, it is one of the darwinias known as mountain bells.

== Description ==
Wittwer's darwinia is an erect shrub with a single stem growing to a height of 60–80 centimetres (20–30 in). The leaves are well spaced along the branches, linear in shape, triangular in cross-section, 5–10 millimetres (0.2–0.4 in) long and less than 0.5 millimetres (0.02 in) wide.

The flowers hang in groups of 5 to 9 surrounded by large, leaf like bracts. The inner bracts are elliptic to egg-shaped, 18–21 millimetres (0.7–0.8 in) long, 6–9 millimetres (0.2–0.4 in) wide and partly cream and partly pink. The outer bracts are cream-coloured and linear in shape. The flowers are cream-coloured and each has ten stamens and a style with a brush on the end. Flowering occurs from August to November.

== Taxonomy ==
The first formal description of D. wittwerorum was published by Neville Marchant and Greg Keighery in 1980 in the journal Nuytsia. The specific epithet (wittwerorum) honours Magda and Ernst Wittwer.

== Distribution and habitat ==
This darwinia is currently only known from eight populations in the lower part of the Stirling Range in the Esperance Plains and Jarrah Forest biogeographic regions, where it grows in open mallee over scrub.

== Conservation ==
Darwinia wittwerorum is classified as "Threatened Flora (Declared Rare Flora — Extant)" by the Western Australian Government Department of Parks and Wildlife and a recovery plan has been prepared. It has also been listed as "Endangered" (EN) under the Australian Government Environment Protection and Biodiversity Conservation Act 1999 (EPBC Act) "due to fragmentation and limited geographic range."
