= Acacia loxophylla =

Scientific classification
- Kingdom: Plantae
- Clade: Tracheophytes
- Clade: Angiosperms
- Clade: Eudicots
- Clade: Rosids
- Order: Fabales
- Family: Fabaceae
- Subfamily: Caesalpinioideae
- Clade: Mimosoid clade
- Genus: Acacia
- Species: A. loxophylla

Binomial name
- Acacia loxophylla Benth.
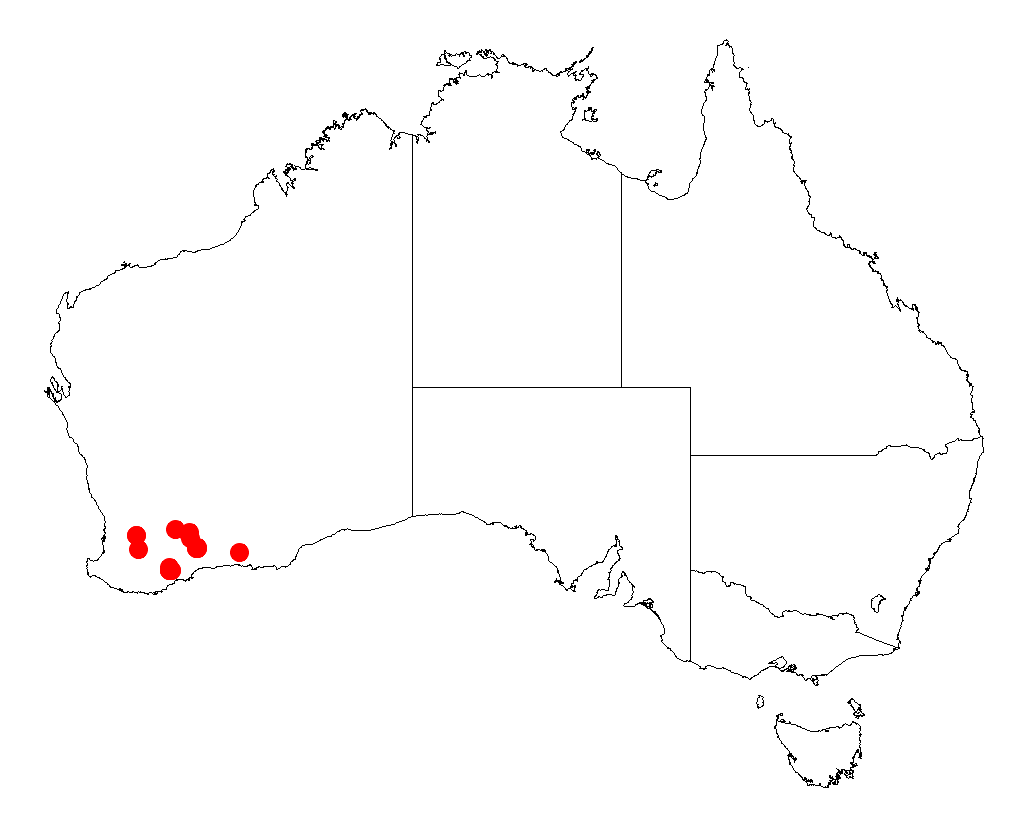
- Occurrence data from AVH

Synonyms
- Acacia loxophylla Benth. var. loxophylla; Racosperma loxophyllum (Benth.) Pedley

Species of legume

Acacia loxophylla is a species of flowering plant in the family Fabaceae and is endemic to south-western Western Australia. It is a densely branched shrub, with widely elliptic or oblong phyllodes, heads of pale yellow or silvery flowers, and linear, curved pods.

== Description ==
Acacia loxophylla is a densely branched shrub that typically grows to a height of 30–90 cm (12–35 in) and has glabrous branchlets, sometimes a few soft hairs pressed against the surface and often resinous. Its phyllodes are widely elliptic to elliptic or oblong, 3–8 mm (0.12–0.31 in) long, 2–5 mm (0.079–0.197 in) wide, sometimes with a beak-like tip, glabrous and resinous. There are two to four veins on each surface of the phyllodes and a gland 0.5–1.0 mm (0.020–0.039 in) above the pulvinus. The flowers are borne in one or two spherical heads on peduncles 2–3 mm (0.079–0.118 in) long. The heads are densely covered with pale yellow or silvery hairs and are 4–5 mm (0.16–0.20 in) in diameter with 20 to 39 flowers. The immature pods are linear and curved and covered with white hairs.

== Taxonomy ==
Acacia loxophylla was first formally described in 1855 by George Bentham in the journal Linnaea: ein Journal für die Botanik in ihrem ganzen Umfange, oder Beiträge zur Pflanzenkunde. The specific epithet (loxophylla) means 'oblique-leaved'.

== Distribution and habitat ==
This species of wattle is only known from Pingelly, near Billericay and near Ongerup in the Avon Wheatbelt and Mallee bioregions of south-western Western Australia, where it grows in loam or sandy loam.

== See also ==
- List of Acacia species
