= Scaevola macrophylla =

Conservation status
- Critically endangered (EPBC Act)

Scientific classification
- Kingdom: Plantae
- Clade: Embryophytes
- Clade: Tracheophytes
- Clade: Spermatophytes
- Clade: Angiosperms
- Clade: Eudicots
- Clade: Asterids
- Order: Asterales
- Family: Goodeniaceae
- Genus: Scaevola
- Species: S. macrophylla

Binomial name
- Scaevola macrophylla (de Vriese) Benth.

Synonyms
- Lobelia macrophylla Kuntze nom. illeg.; Molkenboeria macrophylla de Vriese

Species of flowering plant

Scaevola macrophylla is a species of flowering plant in the family Goodeniaceae and is endemic to the south of Western Australia. It is an erect herb with a woody base, more or less stem-clasping, toothed, egg-shaped to oblong leaves, and dense racemes of blue flowers and rough, oval fruit.

== Description ==
Scaevola macrophylla is an erect herb with a woody base that typically grows to a height of up to 40 cm (16 in) and has yellowish hairs. Its leaves are more or less stem-clasping, egg-shaped to oblong with toothed edges, 20–40 mm (0.79–1.57 in) long and 10–20 mm (0.39–0.79 in) wide. The flowers are borne in dense racemes up to 50 mm (2.0 in) long with leaf-like bracts and smaller, linear bracteoles about 8 mm (0.31 in) long. The sepals are broadly egg-shaped and joined at the base, 0.5 mm (0.020 in) long, and the petals are about 22 mm (0.87 in) long and blue with soft hairs on the outside and a yellowish beard inside. The ovary has two locules with a long purplish beard, longer than the bristles on the petals. Flowering has not been observed, but the fruit is oval, 3 mm (0.12 in) long and rough, with a few scattered hairs.

== Taxonomy ==
The species was first formally described in 1854 by Willem Hendrik de Vriese who gave it the name Molkenboeria macrophylla in the journal Natuurkundige verhandelingen van de Hollandsche Maatschappij der Wetenschappen te Haarlem. In 1868 George Bentham assigned it to the genus, Scaevola as S. macrophylla in his Flora Australiensis. The specific epithet (macrophylla) means 'large-leaved'.

== Distribution and habitat ==
This species of Scaevola is only known from three populations in the Cape Riche area near Albany, where it grows in rocky loam in or near forests with Verticordia and Kunzea species.

== Conservation status ==
Scaevola macrophylla is listed as 'Critically Endangered' under the Australian Government Environment Protection and Biodiversity Conservation Act 1999 and as 'Threatened Flora (Declared Rare Flora — Extant)' by the Department of Environment and Conservation (Western Australia). It is described as "extremely rare", being documented on only four occasions; a discovery after a controlled burn in 2021 was its first record since 1990.
