= Isopogon uncinatus =

Albany cone bush

Conservation status
- Critically endangered (EPBC Act)

Scientific classification
- Kingdom: Plantae
- Clade: Tracheophytes
- Clade: Angiosperms
- Clade: Eudicots
- Order: Proteales
- Family: Proteaceae
- Genus: Isopogon
- Species: I. uncinatus

Binomial name
- Isopogon uncinatus R.Br.
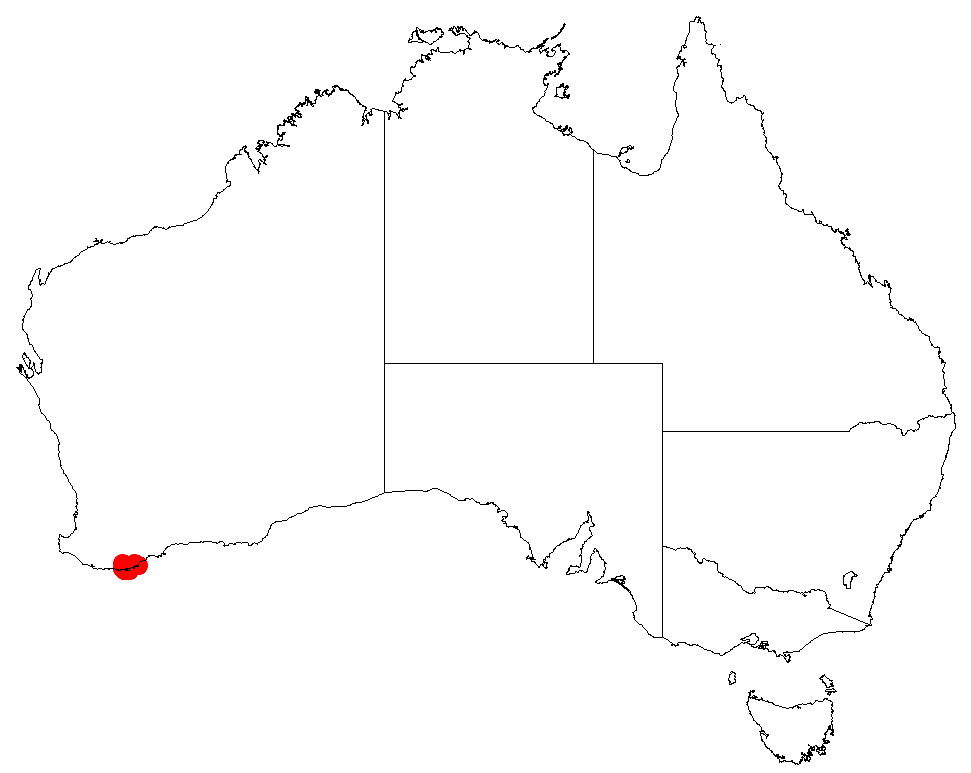
- Occurrence data from Australasian Virtual Herbarium

Synonyms
- Atylus lacinatus B.D.Jacks. nom. illeg.; Atylus uncinatus (R.Br.) Kuntze

Species of shrub endemic to Western Australia

Isopogon uncinatus, commonly known as Albany cone bush, is a species of flowering plant in the family Proteaceae and is endemic to a restricted area near Albany in Western Australia. It is a small shrub with very short stems, linear to egg-shaped leaves with the narrower end towards the base, and spherical heads of yellowish flowers. It is the rarest isopogon and was thought to be extinct until rediscovered in the 1980s.

== Description ==
Isopogon uncinatus is a spreading shrub that typically grows to about 30–50 cm (12–20 in) and wide and has very short, densely hairy, brownish branchlets. The leaves are linear to egg-shaped with the narrower end towards the base, 80–320 mm (3.1–12.6 in) long, and 3–9 mm (0.12–0.35 in) wide, usually with a hooked tip, especially when young. The flowers are arranged in sessile, spherical heads 25–30 mm (0.98–1.18 in) in diameter, surrounded by clusters of leaves near the base of the plant. The flowers are up to 25 mm (0.98 in) long and yellowish, glabrous near the base but densely silky-hairy near the tip. Flowering has been recorded in October and the fruit is a hairy nut, fused with others in a more or less spherical head up to 12 mm (0.47 in) in diameter.

== Taxonomy ==
Isopogon uncinatus was first formally described in 1830 by Robert Brown in the Supplementum to his Prodromus Florae Novae Hollandiae et Insulae Van Diemen from material collected by William Baxter at King George's Sound. The specific epithet (uncinatus) means "hooked".

== Distribution and habitat ==
Albany cone bush grows in stunted jarrah scrub in swampy depression and on hillslopes near Albany where it is only known from nine small populations.

== Conservation status ==
This is the rarest isopogon and was thought to be extinct until rediscovered in the 1980s. It is listed as "critically endangered" under the Australian Government Environment Protection and Biodiversity Conservation Act 1999 and as "Threatened Flora (Declared Rare Flora — Extant)" by the Department of Environment and Conservation (Western Australia). The main threats to the species are disease caused by Phytophthora cinnamomi, inappropriate fire regimes and drought.
