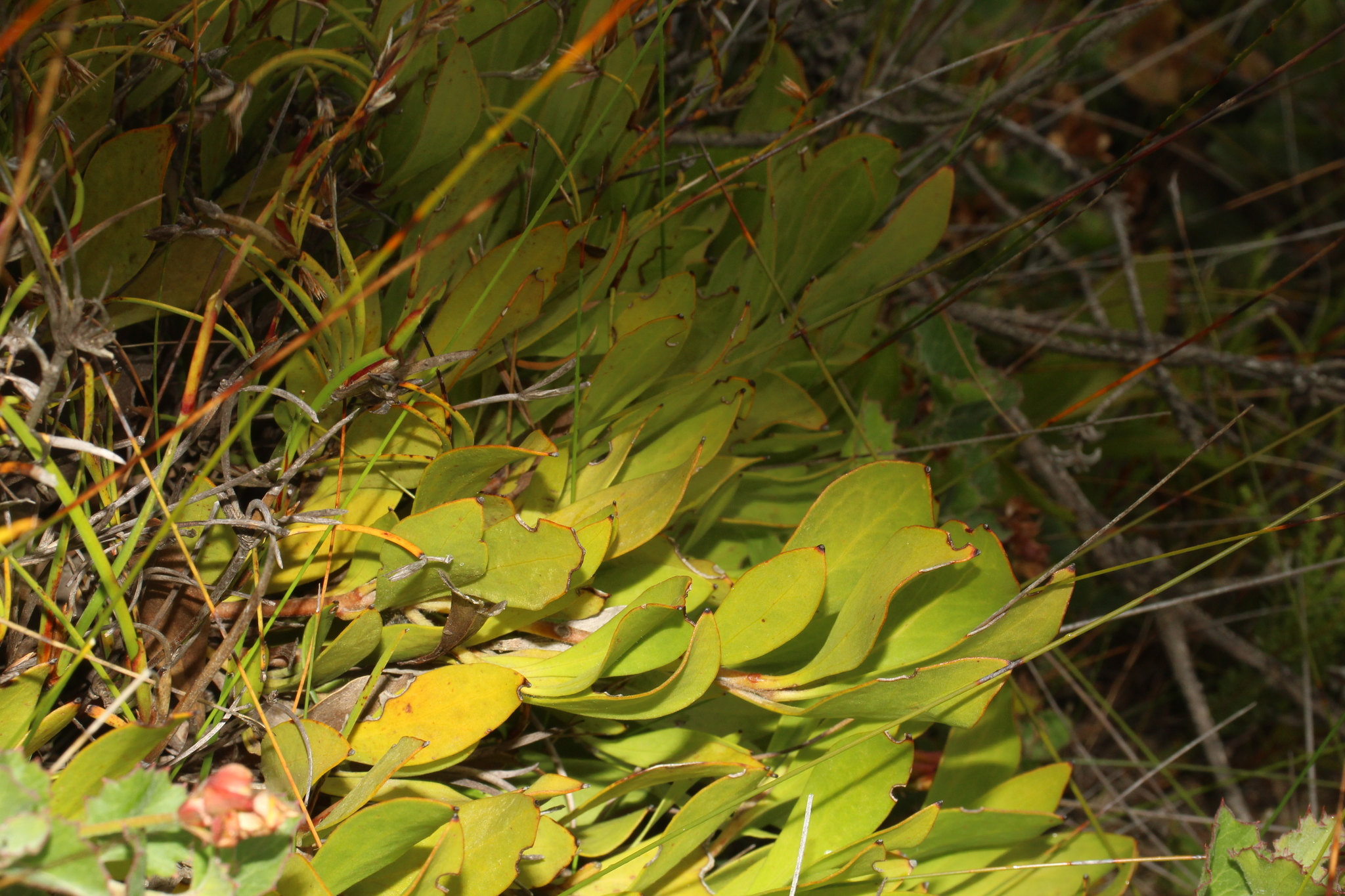

Conservation status
- Endangered (EPBC Act)

Scientific classification
- Kingdom: Plantae
- Clade: Tracheophytes
- Clade: Angiosperms
- Clade: Eudicots
- Order: Proteales
- Family: Proteaceae
- Genus: Persoonia
- Species: P. micranthera

Binomial name
- Persoonia micranthera P.H.Weston

Synonyms
- Persoonia micrantha S.J.van Leeuwen, A.P.Br. & S.J.Patrick

= Persoonia micranthera =

Small-flowered snottygobble

Species of flowering plant

Persoonia micranthera, commonly known as the small-flowered snottygobble, is a species of flowering plant in the family Proteaceae and is endemic to a restricted area in the south-west of Western Australia. It is a low-lying to prostrate shrub with branchlets that are hairy when young, spatula-shaped to lance-shaped leaves with the narrower end towards the base, hairy yellow flowers borne in groups of four to fifteen, and smooth, oval fruit.

== Description ==
Persoonia micranthera is a low-lying to prostrate shrub that typically grows to a height of 10–40 cm (3.9–15.7 in) with thin bark and branchlets that are hairy in their first year. The leaves are spatula-shaped to lance-shaped or egg-shaped with the narrower end towards the base, 40–80 mm (1.6–3.1 in) long and 8–30 mm (0.31–1.18 in) wide. The flowers are arranged in groups of four to fifteen along a rachis 10–60 mm (0.39–2.36 in) long on the ends of branchlets, each flower on a pedicel 2.5–8 mm (0.098–0.315 in) long. The tepals are yellow, hairy on the outside, 10.5–14 mm (0.41–0.55 in) long. Flowering occurs from February to March and the fruit is a smooth drupe.

== Taxonomy ==
Persoonia micranthera was first formally described in 1994 by Peter Weston in the journal Telopea from specimens he collected on the summit of Bluff Knoll in 1980.

== Distribution and habitat ==
Small-flowered snottygobble grows as an understorey shrub in thicket vegetation at high altitudes on peaks in the eastern Stirling Range. In 2007 five populations were known, two with fewer than ten mature plants, two with fewer than one hundred and two with more than one hundred individuals.

== Conservation status ==
This geebung is listed as "endangered" ander the Australian Government Environment Protection and Biodiversity Conservation Act 1999, as "Threatened Flora (Declared Rare Flora — Extant)" by the Department of Environment and Conservation (Western Australia) and an Interim Recovery Plan has been prepared. The main threats to the species include Phytophthora cinnamomi causing dieback, inappropriate fire regimes, trampling and grazing by local fauna.
