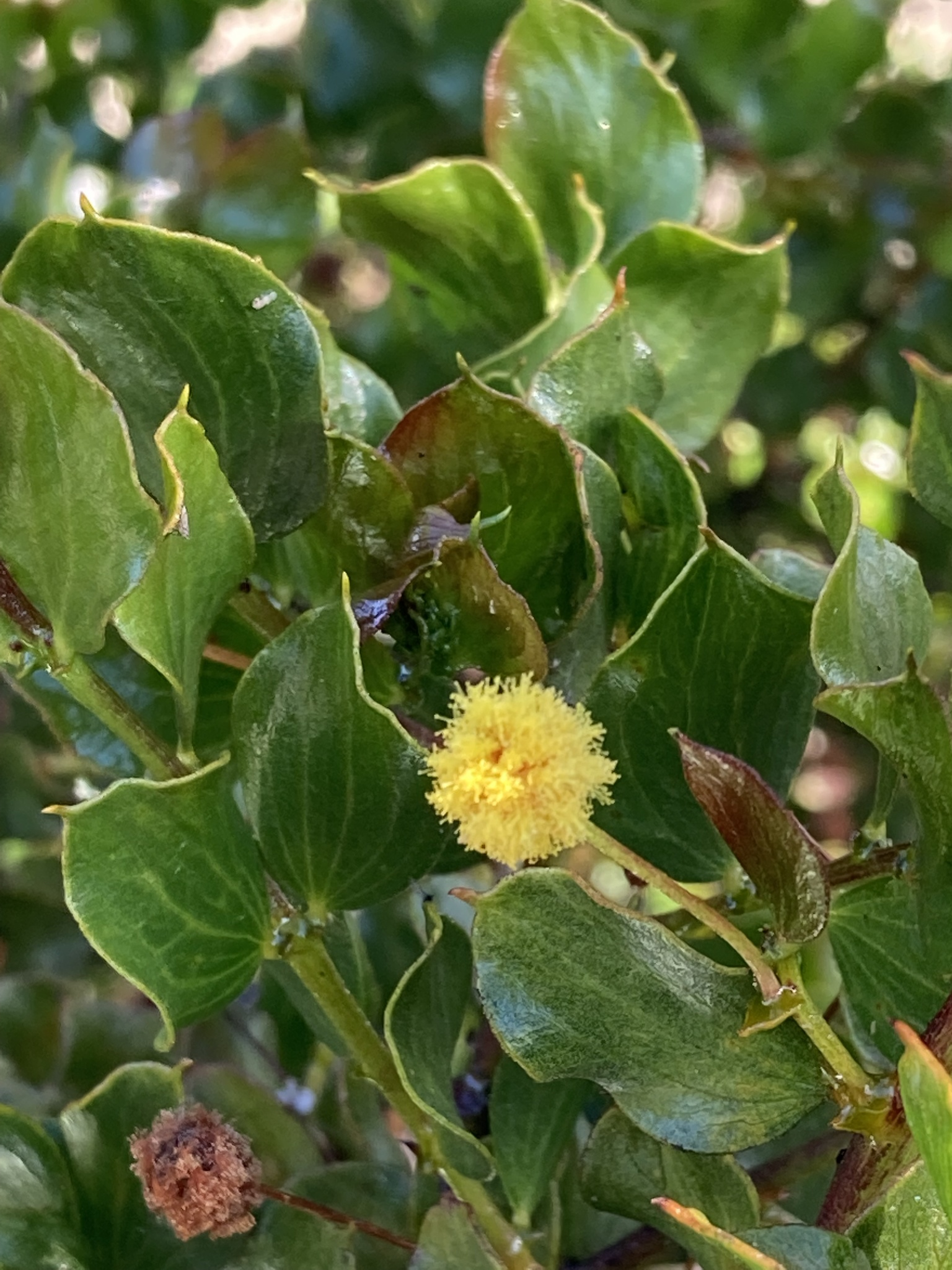

Conservation status
- Critically Endangered (IUCN 3.1)

- Declared rare (DEC)

Scientific classification
- Kingdom: Plantae
- Clade: Tracheophytes
- Clade: Angiosperms
- Clade: Eudicots
- Clade: Rosids
- Order: Fabales
- Family: Fabaceae
- Subfamily: Caesalpinioideae
- Clade: Mimosoid clade
- Genus: Acacia
- Species: A. awestoniana

Binomial name
- Acacia awestoniana R.S.Cowan & Maslin
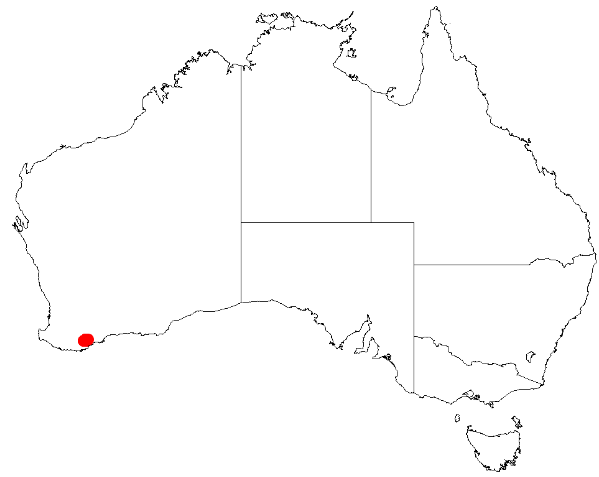
- Acacia awestoniana occurrence data from Australasian Virtual Herbarium

Synonyms
- Acacia aff. dictyoneura [P2] (A.S.Weston 9708); Acacia awestonii Pedley orth. var.; Racosperma awestonianum (R.S.Cowan & Maslin) Pedley; Racosperma awestonianum (R.S.Cowan & Maslin) Pedley isonym; Racosperma awestonii Pedley orth. var.

= Acacia awestoniana =

Stirling Range wattle

Species of legume

Acacia awestoniana, commonly known as Stirling Range wattle, is a species of flowering plant in the family Fabaceae and is endemic to a restricted area in the south-west of Western Australia. It is a spreading, sticky shrub with wavy, widely elliptic to elliptic, phyllodes, spherical heads of golden-yellow flowers, and narrowly oblong pods up to 22 mm (0.87 in) long.

== Description ==
Acacia awestoniana is a spreading, sticky shrub that typically grows to a height of 2.4–3 m (7 ft 10 in – 9 ft 10 in) and a width of up to 4 m (13 ft). Its phyllodes are wavy, widely elliptic to elliptic, 15–30 mm (0.59–1.18 in) long and 11–22 mm (0.43–0.87 in) wide, leathery and glabrous with three to six main veins. The flowers are borne in up to three racemes of spherical heads on a glabrous peduncle 12–20 mm (0.47–0.79 in) long, each head 5–6 mm (0.20–0.24 in) in diameter with 54 to 60 golden-yellow flowers. Flowering occurs from September to November and the pods are narrowly oblong, up to 22 mm (0.87 in) long and 3–5 mm (0.12–0.20 in) wide containing oblong, glossy brown seeds about 4 mm (0.16 in) long.

== Taxonomy ==
Acacia awestoniana was first formally described in 1990 by Richard Sumner Cowan and Bruce Maslin in the journal Nuytsia from specimens collected on the west side of Chester Pass Road at the northern boundary of Stirling Range National Park. The specific epithet (awestoniana) honours Arthur W. Weston, "collector of most of the material known of the species and a most enthusiastic and knowledgeable field botanist in Western Australia".

== Distribution and habitat ==
Stirling Range wattle is confined an area near the northern boundary of the Stirling Range National Park where it grows in wandoo woodland or along watercourses. The plant is found on the lower slopes, on flats and along watercourses and grows in loamy or sandy clay loamy soils.

== Conservation status ==
Acacia awestoniana is listed as critically endangered on the IUCN Red List of Threatened Species and the Biodiversity Conservation Act 2016 Threatened and Priority Flora list, and fewer than 1,000 individual plants are known to exist. It is also listed as Declared Rare on the Western Australian Department of Environment and Conservation Declared Rare and Priority Flora List and as vulnerable under the Environment Protection and Biodiversity Conservation Act 1999. The species occurs in a very restricted distribution, where its extent of occurrence and area of occupancy are not believed to exceed 12 km^{2} (4.6 sq mi). The major identified threats include increased bushfire frequency and grazing from quokkas and introduced rabbits. Due to the species only being known from a single location, these threats could potentially affect the entire population in a short period of time.

Acacia awestoniana

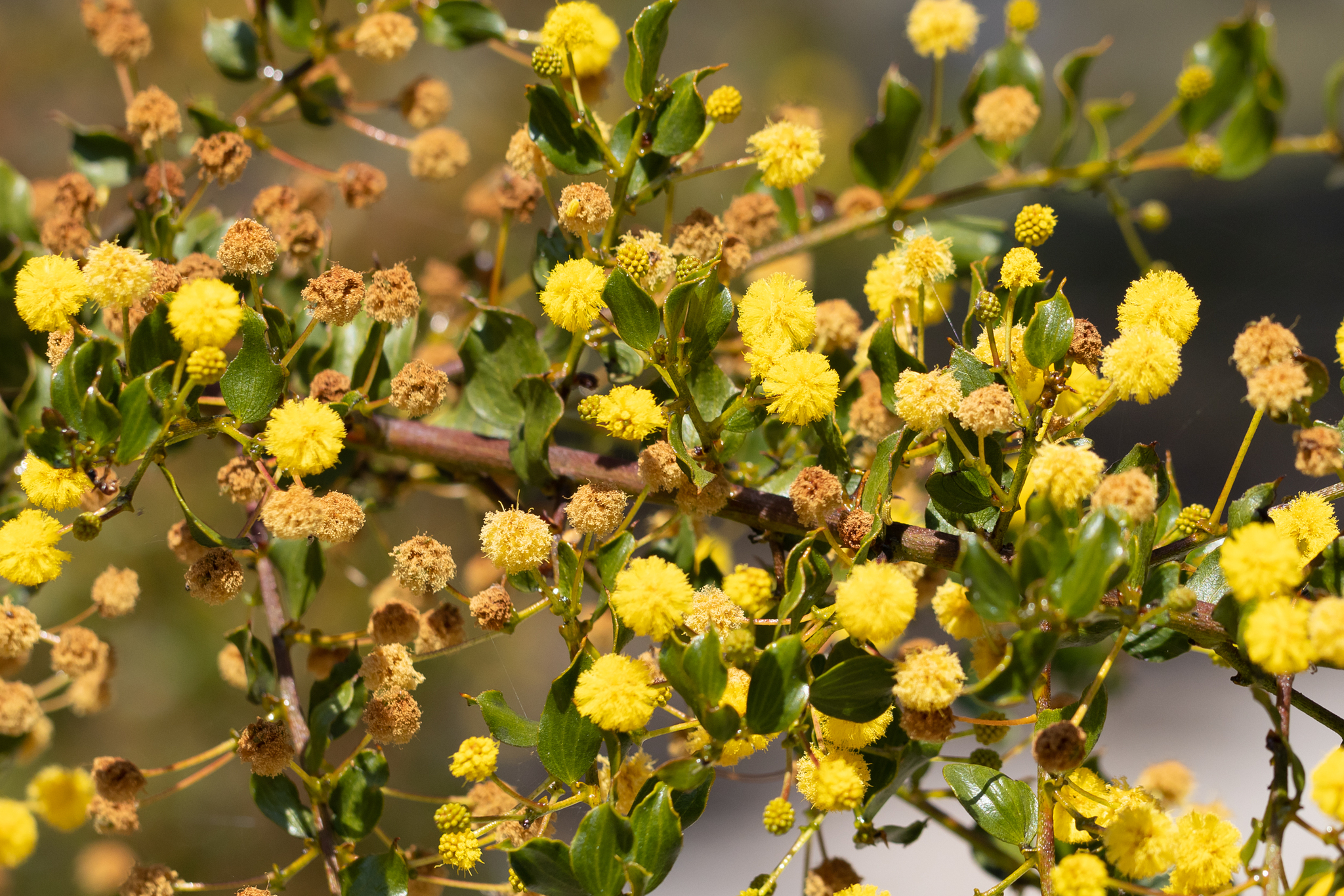

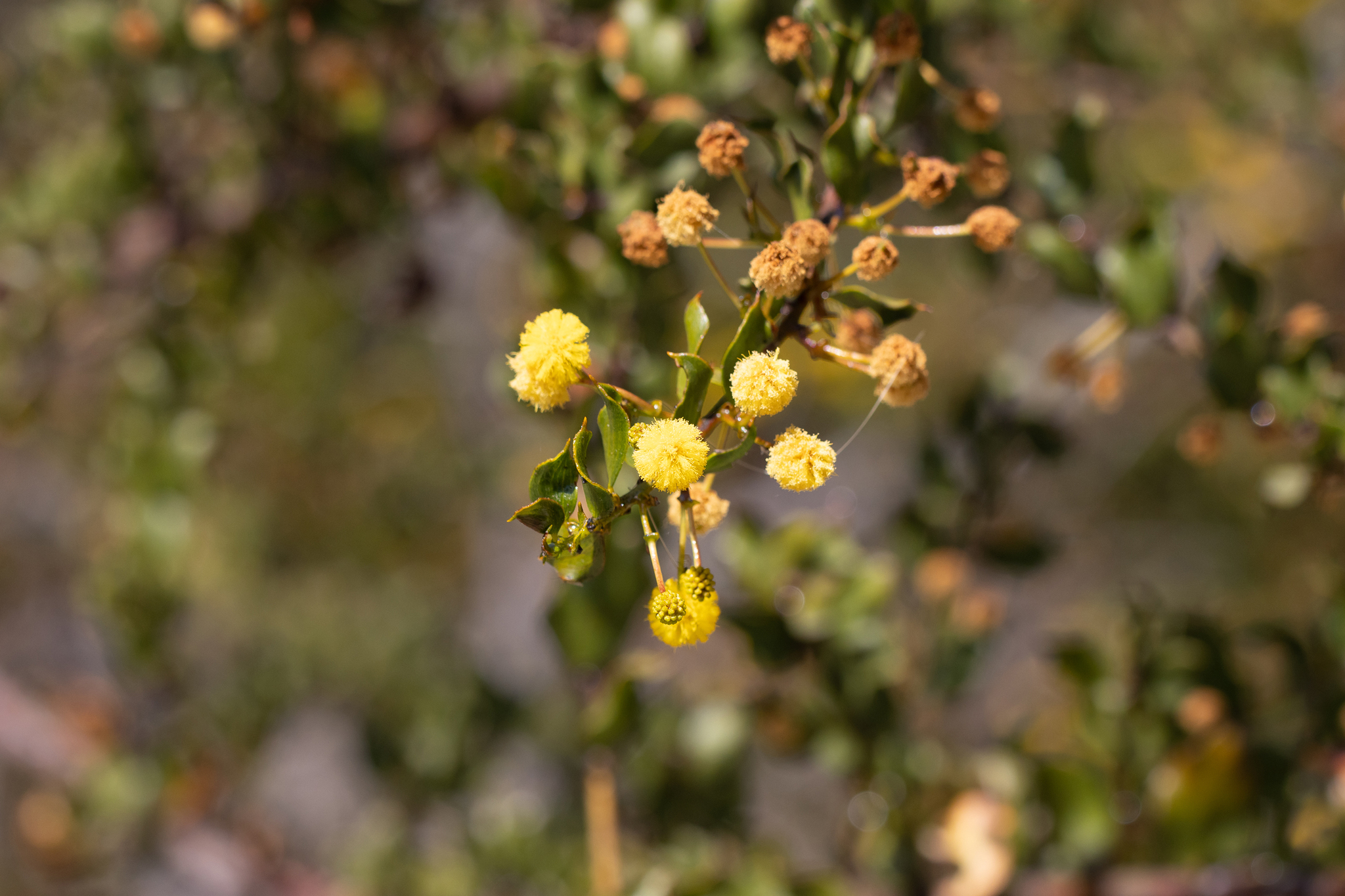

== See also ==
- List of Acacia species
