= Daviesia pseudaphylla =

Conservation status
- Endangered (EPBC Act)

Scientific classification
- Kingdom: Plantae
- Clade: Tracheophytes
- Clade: Angiosperms
- Clade: Eudicots
- Clade: Rosids
- Order: Fabales
- Family: Fabaceae
- Subfamily: Faboideae
- Genus: Daviesia
- Species: D. pseudaphylla

Binomial name
- Daviesia pseudaphylla Crisp

Species of legume

Daviesia pseudaphylla, commonly known as Stirling Range daviesia, is a species of flowering plant in the family Fabaceae and is endemic to the Stirling Range in the south-west of Western Australia. It is an open, spreading, glabrous shrub with low-lying stems, scattered, cylindrical phyllodes indistinguishable from branchlets, and orange-yellow and dark reddish flowers.

== Description ==
Daviesia pseudaphylla is an open, spreading, low-lying, glabrous shrub that typically grows up to 0.35 m (1 ft 2 in) high and 1.3 m (4 ft 3 in) wide. Its phyllodes are widely scattered, cylindrical, up to 300 mm (12 in) long and 0.75–1.5 mm (0.030–0.059 in) wide and indistinguishable from the branchlets. The flowers are usually arranged singly or pairs on a peduncle up to 1 mm (0.039 in) long, each flower on a pedicel about 4 mm (0.16 in) long with spatula-shaped bracts about 4 mm (0.16 in) long at the base. The sepals are 3.0–3.5 mm (0.12–0.14 in) long and joined at the base the upper two lobes joined for most of their length and the lower three about 1 mm (0.039 in) long. The standard petal is broadly elliptic, 9–10 mm (0.35–0.39 in) long, 8–10 mm (0.31–0.39 in) wide, and yellow-orange with a dark purple back. The wings are about 8 mm (0.31 in) long and yellow-orange, the keel about 6 mm (0.24 in) long and dark reddish. Flowering occurs from July to September and the fruit is a triangular pod 14–17 mm (0.55–0.67 in) long.

== Taxonomy ==
Daviesia pseudaphylla was first formally described in 1995 by Michael Crisp in Australian Systematic Botany from specimens collected in the Stirling Range by Kenneth Newbey in 1978. The specific epithet (pseudaphylla) means "false-leafless", referring to the species' appearing to lack phyllodes.

== Distribution and habitat ==
Stirling Range daviesia is only known from two small populations in the Stirling Range where it grows on gentle slopes in open mallee and heath near the foot of the range.

== Conservation status ==
Daviesia pseudaphylla is declared an "endangered" species under the Australian Government Environment Protection and Biodiversity Conservation Act 1999, and as "threatened" by the Western Australian Government Department of Biodiversity, Conservation and Attractions, meaning that it is in danger of extinction. The main threat to the species is inappropriate fire regimes, and a potential threat is from dieback due to Phytophthora cinnamomi.
