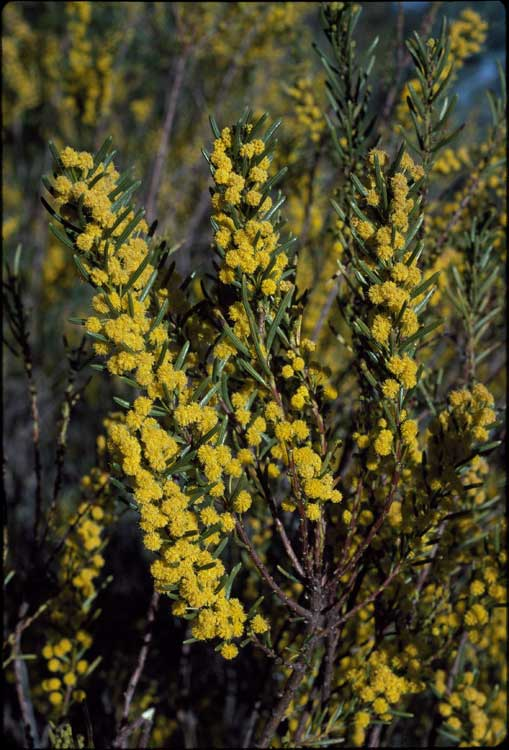
- In the Australian National Botanic Gardens

Scientific classification
- Kingdom: Plantae
- Clade: Embryophytes
- Clade: Tracheophytes
- Clade: Spermatophytes
- Clade: Angiosperms
- Clade: Eudicots
- Clade: Rosids
- Order: Fabales
- Family: Fabaceae
- Subfamily: Caesalpinioideae
- Clade: Mimosoid clade
- Genus: Acacia
- Species: A. sulcata

Binomial name
- Acacia sulcata R.Br.
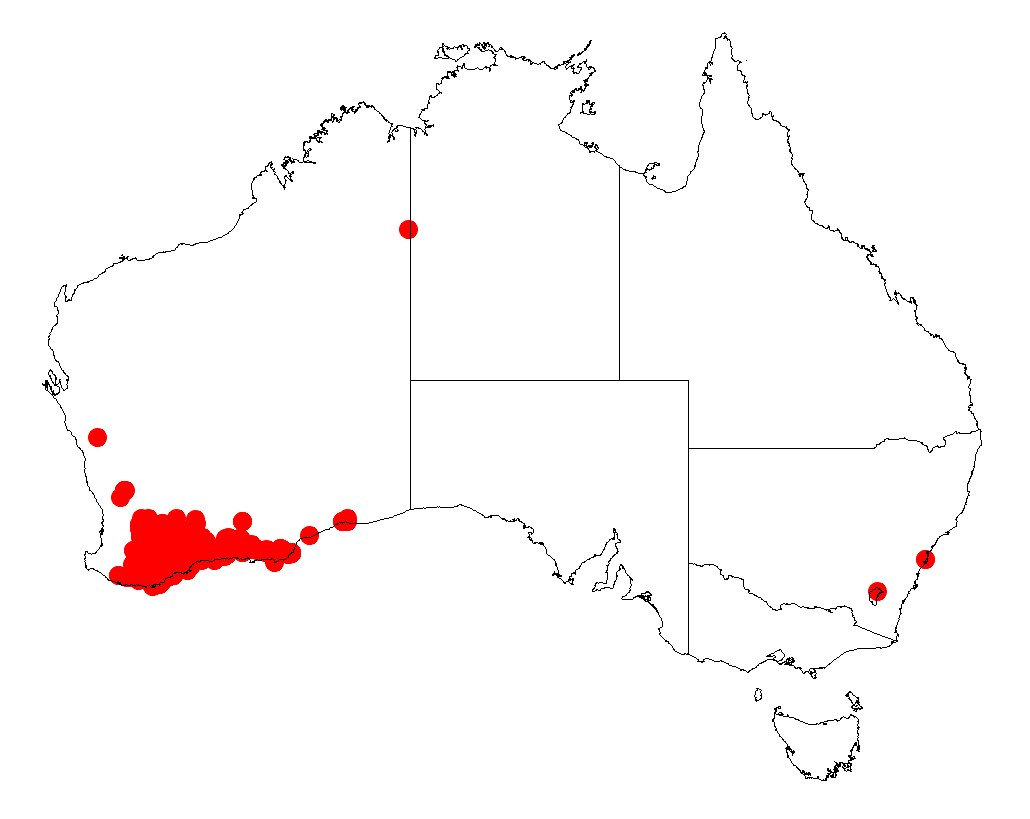
- Occurrence data from AVH

= Acacia sulcata =

Species of legume

Acacia sulcata is a shrub of the genus Acacia and the subgenus Plurinerves that is endemic to an area of south western Australia.

== Description ==
The shrub typically grows to a height of 0.2 to 2 metres (1 to 7 ft) and has a spreading habit. It has glabrous to minutely hairy branchlets that can be covered in a fine white powdery coating toward the apex. Like most species of Acacia it has phyllodes rather than true leaves. The cylindrical to tapering glabrous phyllodes are straight or slightly incurved with a length of 5 to 25 mm (0.20 to 0.98 in) and a width of 1 to 2 mm (0.039 to 0.079 in) and have six to seven prominent nerves in total. It blooms from June to February and produces yellow flowers. The simple inflorescences occur singly or in pairs in the axils and have spherical flower-heads that have a diameter of 3 to 4 mm (0.12 to 0.16 in) and contain 10 to 15 golden coloured flowers. Following flowering thinly leathery to papery seed pods form that are glabrous and sometimes covered in a fine white powdery coating. The pods have a linear to undulate shape with a length that is up to 3.5 cm (1.4 in) and a width of 2 to 4 mm (0.079 to 0.157 in) and contain mottled grey to black or brown coloured seeds that have a widely elliptic to ovate shape.

== Taxonomy ==
There are three varieties:

- Acacia sulcata var. planoconvexa
- Acacia sulcata var. platyphylla
- Acacia sulcata var. sulcata

== Distribution ==
It is native to an area in the Great Southern, Goldfields-Esperance and Wheatbelt regions of Western Australia where it is commonly situated among granite outcrops, on undulating plains, rocky ridges, rises and hills growing in gravel lateritic, sandy, clay or loamy soils. The range of the plant extends from around Corrigin in the north west to around Albany in the south west and then extending eastward through coastal or near-coastal areas to around Israelite Bay in the east.

== See also ==
- List of Acacia species
