= Esperance Plains =

Bioregion in Western Australia

Coordinates: 33°57′S 120°08′E

- Region
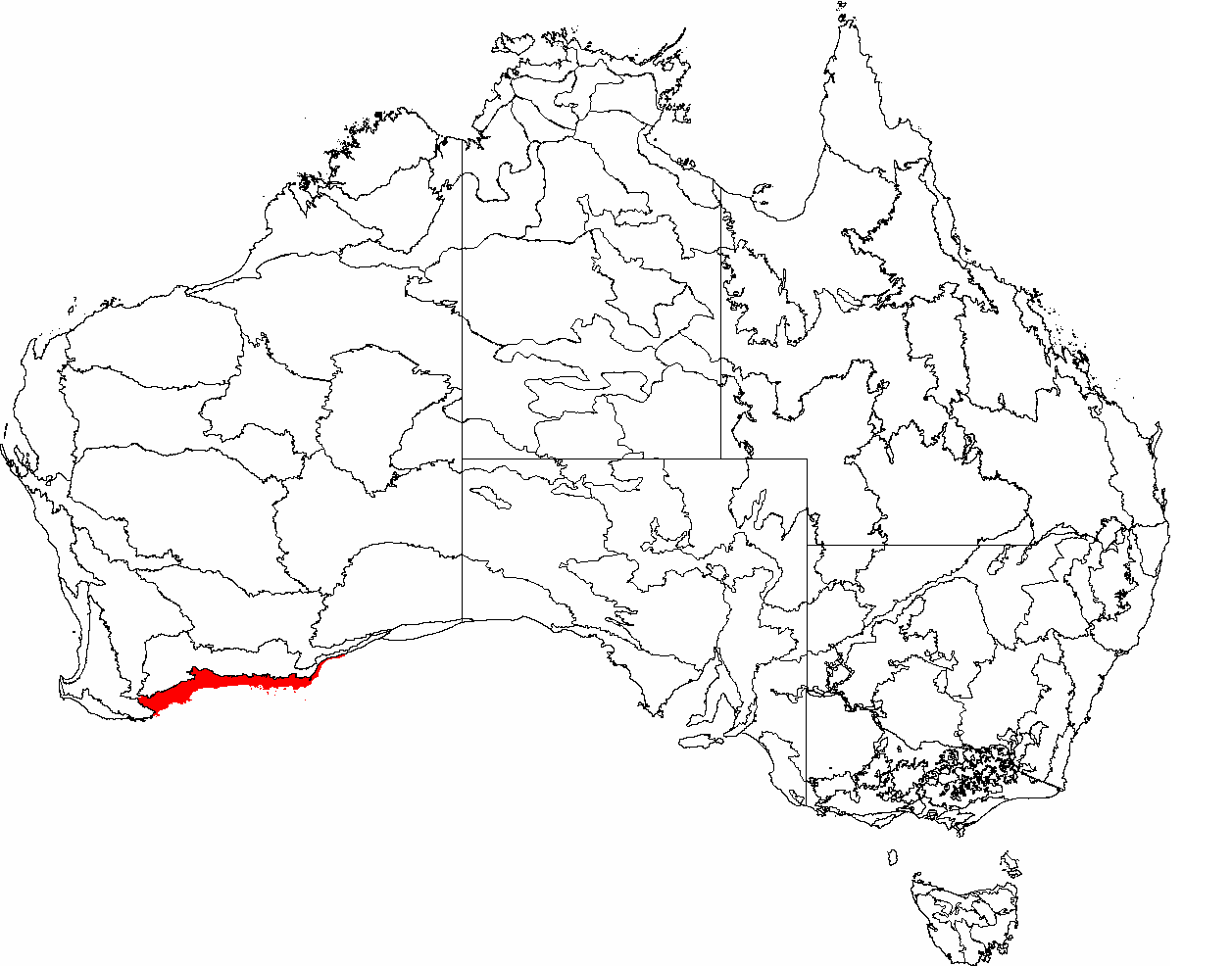
- The interim Australian bioregions, with Esperance Plains in red
- Country: Australia
- State: Western Australia

Area
  - Total: 29,213.27 km^{2} (11,279.31 sq mi)
Regions around Esperance Plains
Mallee	Mallee	Mallee
Avon Wheatbelt	Esperance Plains	Great Australian Bight
Jarrah Forest	Southern Ocean	Great Australian Bight

Esperance Plains, also known as Eyre Botanical District, is a biogeographic region in southern Western Australia on the south coast between the Avon Wheatbelt and Hampton bioregions, and bordered to the north by the Mallee region. It is a plain punctuated by granite and quartz outcrops and ranges, with a semi-arid Mediterranean climate and vegetation consisting mostly of mallee-heath and proteaceous scrub. About half of the region has been cleared for intensive agriculture. Recognised as a bioregion under the Interim Biogeographic Regionalisation for Australia (IBRA), it was first defined by John Stanley Beard in 1980.

== Geography and geology ==
The Esperance Plains may be roughly approximated as the land within 40 kilometres (25 mi) of the coast between Albany and Point Culver on the south coast of Western Australia. It has an area of about 29,000 square kilometres (11,000 sq mi), making it about 9% of the South West Province, 1% of the state, and 0.3% of Australia. It is bounded to the north by the Mallee region, and to the west by the Jarrah Forest region. The region is only sparsely populated; the only towns of note are Bremer Bay, Ravensthorpe, Hopetoun and Esperance.

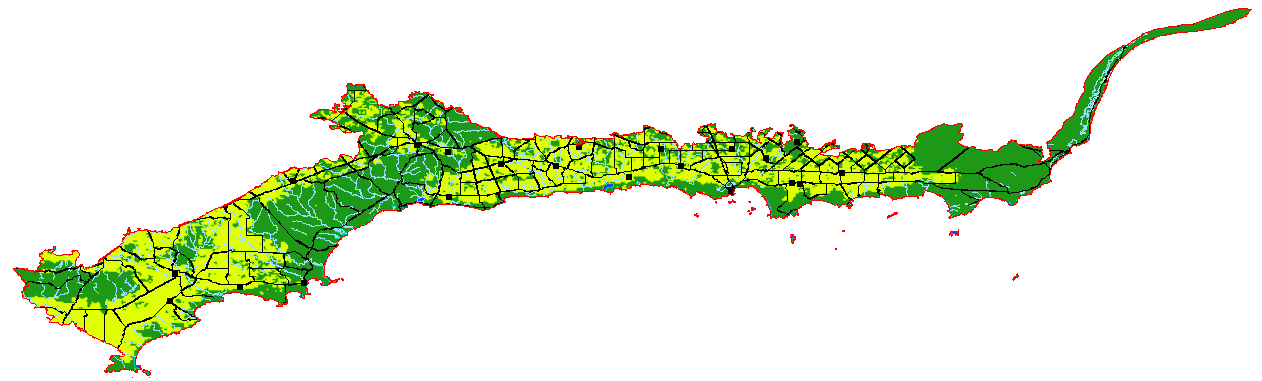
The Esperance Plains region, with agricultural areas in yellow, and native vegetation in green

The region's topography consists of a plain that rises from near sea level to an altitude of about 200 metres (660 ft), broken in places by outcrops of granite domes and quartzite ranges. The soil is Eocene sediments overlying clay or ironstone gravel derived from the Albany-Fraser Orogen.

== Climate ==
Esperance Plains has a warm, dry, Mediterranean climate, with five to six dry months. Rainfall in winter is typically between 500 and 700 millimetres (19–27 in).

Climatic table for Esperance, a town in the Esperance Plains region
	Jan	Feb	Mar	Apr	May	Jun	Jul	Aug	Sep	Oct	Nov	Dec	Year
Mean daily maximum temperature	26.2°C; 79.2°F	26.2°C; 79.2°F	25.1°C; 77.2°F	23.2°C; 73.8°F	20.4°C; 68.7°F	18.0°C; 64.4°F	17.1°C; 62.8°F	17.7°C; 63.8°F	19.3°C; 66.7°F	21.0°C; 69.8°F	23.0°C; 73.4°F	24.5°C; 76.1°F	21.8°C; 71.2°F
Mean daily minimum temperature	15.5°C; 59.9°F	16.0°C; 60.8°F	15.0°C; 59.0°F	13.2°C; 55.8°F	11.0°C; 51.8°F	9.1°C; 48.4°F	8.3°C; 46.9°F	8.6°C; 47.5°F	9.5°C; 49.1°F	10.6°C; 51.1°F	12.6°C; 54.7°F	14.3°C; 57.7°F	12.0°C; 53.6°F
Mean total rainfall	21.7 mm 0.83 in	27.3 mm 1.05 in	28.8 mm 1.11 in	42.7 mm 1.64 in	74.2 mm 2.85 in	81.1 mm 3.12 in	99.6 mm 3.83 in	84.1 mm 3.23 in	59.9 mm 2.30 in	48.4 mm 1.86 in	34.7 mm 1.33 in	18.1 mm 0.70 in	620.6 mm 23.87 in
Mean number of rain days	5.7	5.8	7.7	10.5	13.9	16.1	17.1	16.6	14.2	12.1	9.6	6.7	135.9
Source: Bureau of Meteorology

== Vegetation ==
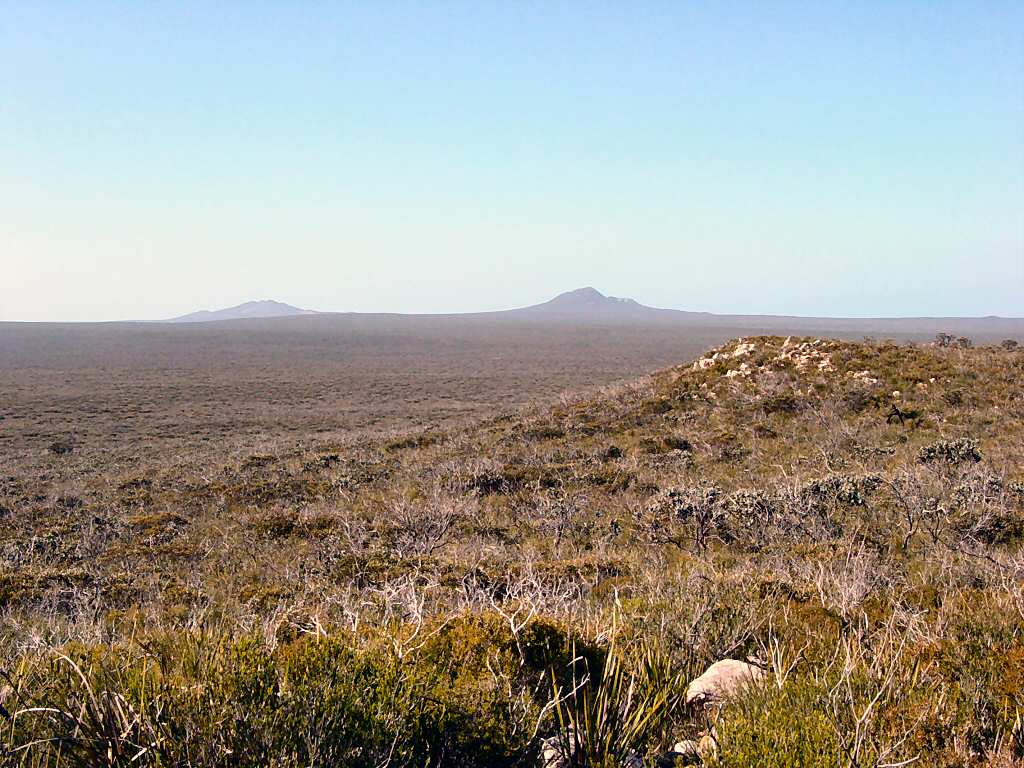
Fitzgerald River National Park, showing scrub-heath on a plain, with granite outcrop on the middle-ground right

The main vegetation formation of the Esperance Plains region is mallee-heath; this covers about 58% of the region. Other significant vegetation forms include mallee (17%), scrub-heath (13%) and coastal dune scrub (4%). There is very little woodland; the only woodland communities are some of Eucalyptus marginata (jarrah), Corymbia calophylla (marri) and E. wandoo (wandoo) in valleys of the Stirling Range (1%); and some E. loxophleba (York gum) and Eucalyptus occidentalis (flat-topped yate) woodland in low-lying areas. There is also a small amount of low forest on islands off the coast. 1.7% of the region is unvegetated.

As of 2007, the Esperance Plains is known to contain 3506 indigenous vascular plant species, and a further 294 naturalised alien species. The endangered flora of the Esperance Plains region consists of 72 species, with a further 433 species having been declared Priority Flora under the Department of Environment and Conservation's Declared Rare and Priority Flora List.

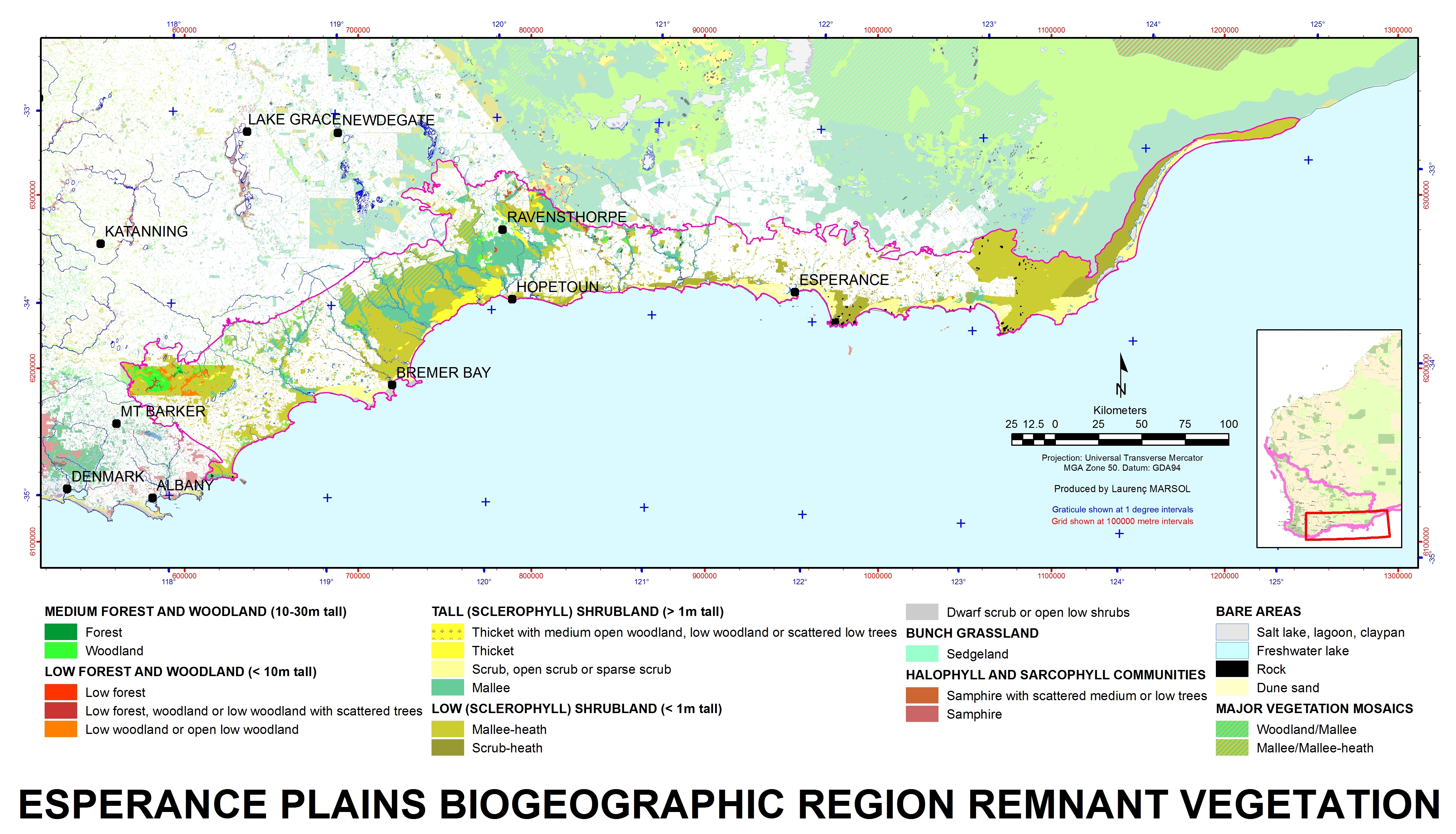
The Esperance Plains biogeographic region, with physiognomic remnant vegetation type.

== Land use ==
Approximately 87% of the Esperance Plains region falls within what the Department of Agriculture and Food calls the "Intensive Land-use Zone", the area of Western Australia that has been largely cleared and developed for intensive agriculture such as cropping and livestock production. Within this area, 45.4% of the native vegetation remains uncleared. The remaining 13% of the region falls within the "Extensive Land-use Zone", where the native vegetation has not been cleared but may have been degraded by the grazing of introduced animals and/or changes to the fire regime. Thus about 47.3% of the total Mallee region has been cleared. The majority of clearing was undertaken by the Government of Western Australia between 1949 and 1969 under three programs: the War Service Settlement program, the subsequent Civilian Settlement program, and the Esperance Land Development program. The first two of these were programs of assisted settlement in which the Government cleared, fenced and stocked virgin crown land, then sold it to aspiring settlers; the last was a partnership with an American-based company that developed nearly 5,000 square kilometres (1,900 sq mi) of land near Esperance for sale. There has been very little clearing since 1980.

More than half of the remaining vegetation is now in protected areas, such as the Fitzgerald River National Park and the Nuytsland Nature Reserve. It therefore has only medium priority under Australia's National Reserve System.

== Biogeography ==
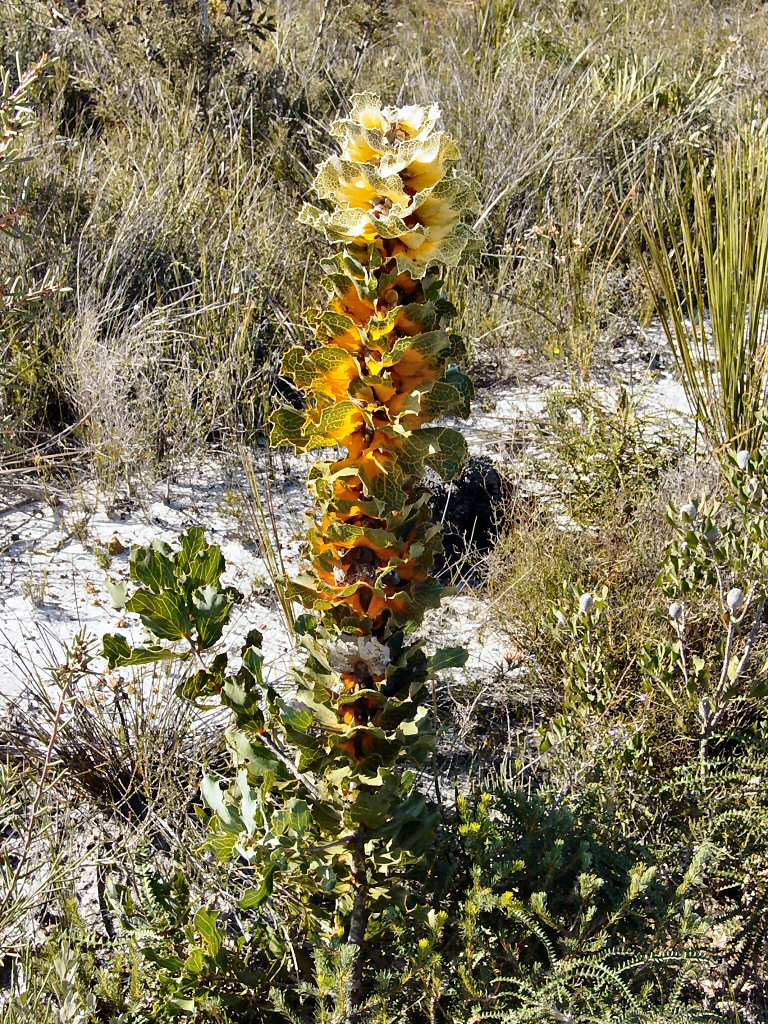
Hakea victoria (royal hakea) is endemic to the Esperance Plains region.

The first biogeographical regionalisation of Western Australia, that of Ludwig Diels in 1906, included a region named "Eyre" that roughly encompassed the present-day Esperance Plains and Mallee regions. Recognition of the Esperance Plains as a distinct biogeographical region appears to have been due to Edward de Courcy Clarke. In 1926, Clarke proposed a regionalisation of Western Australia into "natural regions", including a region that he named "Stirling", which closely matches the present-day Esperance Plains region. In the 1940s and 1950s, Charles Gardner refined Diels' regions, but split Diels' "Eyre" into western and eastern parts.

In 1980, John Stanley Beard published a phytogeographical regionalisation of the state based on data from the Vegetation Survey of Western Australia. This new regionalisation included a district that is essentially identical with the present-day Esperance Plains region, which Beard named "Eyre Botanical District" in honour of Edward John Eyre, first explorer of the area. By 1984, Beard's phytogeographic regions were being presented more generally as "natural regions", and as such were given more widely recognisable names. Thus the "Eyre Botanical District" became "Esperance Plains".

When the IBRA was published in the 1990s, Beard's regionalisation was used as the baseline for Western Australia. The Esperance Plains region was accepted as defined by Beard, and has since survived a number of revisions. Since Version 6.1, Esperance Plains is divided into two subregions, Fitzgerald and Recherche.

Under the World Wildlife Fund's biogeographic regionalisation of the Earth's land into "ecoregions", the Esperance Plains and Mallee regions are combined to form the Esperance mallee ecoregion.
