= List of rare flora of the Mallee region =

Endangered plants in Western Australia

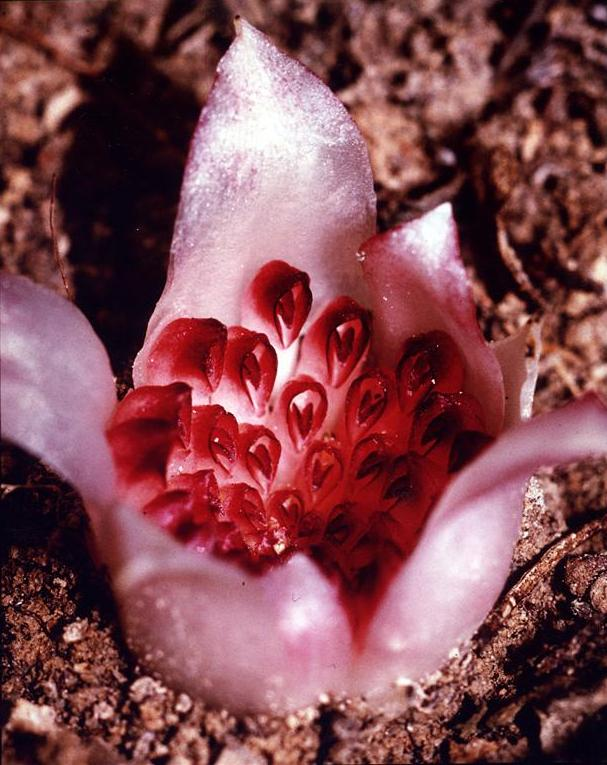
The endangered Rhizanthella gardneri (Underground Orchid) occurs in the Mallee region.

This is a list of endangered flora of the Mallee region, a biogeographic region in southern Western Australia. It includes all taxa that occur in the region, and have been classified as "R: Declared Rare Flora - Extant Taxa" under the Department of Environment and Conservation's Declared Rare and Priority Flora List, and are hence gazetted as endangered extant flora under the Wildlife Conservation Act 1950.

There are no taxa classified as "X: Declared Rare Flora - Presumed Extinct Taxa" for the region.

There are 50 endangered taxa:

- Acacia auratiflora
- Acacia caesariata
- Acacia depressa
- Acacia lanuginophylla
- Acacia leptalea
- Acacia trulliformis
- Adenanthos eyrei (Toolinna Adenanthos)
- Adenanthos pungens subsp. pungens
- Allocasuarina tortiramula (Twisted Sheoak)
- Anigozanthos bicolor subsp. minor
- Banksia sphaerocarpa var. dolichostyla (Ironcap Banksia)
- Boronia capitata subsp. capitata
- Boronia revoluta (Ironcaps Boronia)
- Caladenia bryceana subsp. bryceana
- Caladenia drakeoides
- Caladenia graniticola
- Caladenia melanema
- Calectasia pignattiana
- Conostylis lepidospermoides (Sedge Conostylis)
- Conostylis rogeri
- Drummondita longifolia
- Dryandra pseudoplumosa
- Eremophila lactea
- Eremophila nivea (Silky Eremophila)
- Eremophila verticillata (Whorled Eremophila)
- Eucalyptus merrickiae (Goblet Mallee)
- Eucalyptus steedmanii (Steedman's Gum)
- Goodenia integerrima
- Grevillea involucrata (Lake Varley Grevillea)
- Grevillea scapigera
- Hibbertia priceana
- Lechenaultia laricina (Scarlet Leschenaultia)
- Muehlenbeckia horrida subsp. abdita
- Myoporum cordifolium
- Myoporum turbinatum (Salt Myoporum)
- Orthrosanthus muelleri
- Ptilotus fasciculatus
- Rhizanthella gardneri (Underground Orchid)
- Ricinocarpos trichophorus
- Roycea pycnophylloides (Saltmat)
- Sphenotoma drummondii (Mountain Paper-heath)
- Stachystemon vinosus
- Symonanthus bancroftii
- Tetratheca aphylla (Bungalbin Tetratheca)
- Thelymitra psammophila (Sandplain Sun Orchid)
- Thelymitra stellata (Star Sun Orchid)
- Tribonanthes purpurea (Granite Pink)
- Verticordia crebra
- Verticordia staminosa var. cylindracea
- Verticordia staminosa var. erecta
