= Acacia auratiflora =

Orange-flowered wattle

Conservation status
- Endangered (EPBC Act)

- Vulnerable (IUCN 3.1)

Scientific classification
- Kingdom: Plantae
- Clade: Tracheophytes
- Clade: Angiosperms
- Clade: Eudicots
- Clade: Rosids
- Order: Fabales
- Family: Fabaceae
- Subfamily: Caesalpinioideae
- Clade: Mimosoid clade
- Genus: Acacia
- Species: A. auratiflora

Binomial name
- Acacia auratiflora R.S.Cowan & Maslin
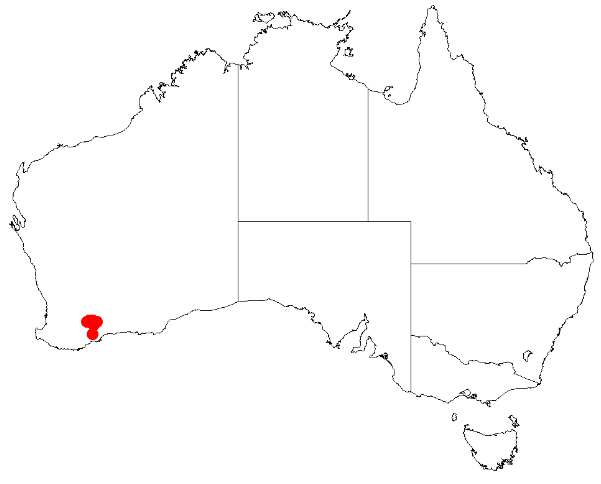
- Acacia auratiflora occurrence data from Australasian Virtual Herbarium

Synonyms
- Racosperma auratiflorum (R.S.Cowan & Maslin) Pedley

Species of legume

Acacia auratiflora, commonly known as the orange-flowered wattle, is a species of flowering plant in the family Fabaceae and is endemic to a restricted part of Western Australia. It is a shrub with narrowly elliptic phyllodes, spherical spikes of golden-yellow flowers, and densely hairy pods.

== Description ==
Acacia auratiflora is a spreading shrub that typically grows to a height of 0.3–1 m (1 ft 0 in – 3 ft 3 in), its branchlets covered with golden or white hairs. Its phyllodes are leathery, pale green, 20–40 mm (0.79–1.57 in) long and 3–7 mm (0.12–0.28 in) wide with a hooked tip. The flowers are golden-yellow and arranged in a spherical head in axils, each head with 32 to 42 flowers and 6–7 mm (0.24–0.28 in) in diameter on a peduncle mostly 1–2 mm (0.039–0.079 in) long. Flowering mostly occurs from August to October, and the pods are densely covered with golden-yellow hairs.

== Taxonomy ==
Acacia auratiflora was first formally described in 1999 by the botanists Richard Sumner Cowan and Bruce Maslin in the journal Nuytsia from specimens collected by Mary Tindale about 35 kilometres (22 mi) east of Lake Grace in 1973. The specific epithet (auratiflora) means 'golden flowers', referring to the colour of the flower parts and the hairs on them.

== Distribution ==
This species of wattle grows in sand, clay or loam in open scrub in plains and wet depressions that can form ephemeral ponds, between Lake Grace and Newdegate in the Mallee bioregion of Western Australia. A total of 15 populations were recorded during a survey in 2009 with a total of 1,200 mature plants over an area of 390 square kilometres (151 sq mi). The species is found amongst open shrub mallee communities or low Eucalyptus salubris woodlands with Melaleuca thickets.

Associated species include many species of Eucalyptus, Melaleuca uncinata, M. adnata, M. lateriflor, Grevillia huegelii and Phebalium filifolium.

== Conservation status ==
Acacia auratiflora is listed as "endangered" under the Australian Government Environment Protection and Biodiversity Conservation Act 1999 and as "Threatened" under the Biodiversity Conservation Act 2016.

== See also ==
- List of Acacia species
