= Acacia torticarpa =

Conservation status
- Priority One — Poorly Known Taxa (DEC)

Scientific classification
- Kingdom: Plantae
- Clade: Tracheophytes
- Clade: Angiosperms
- Clade: Eudicots
- Clade: Rosids
- Order: Fabales
- Family: Fabaceae
- Subfamily: Caesalpinioideae
- Clade: Mimosoid clade
- Genus: Acacia
- Species: A. torticarpa

Binomial name
- Acacia torticarpa R.S.Cowan & Maslin

Species of legume

Acacia torticarpa is a shrub of the genus Acacia and the subgenus Plurinerves that is endemic to a small area in western Australia.

== Description ==
The shrub has branchlets are hairy and marked with parallel grooves and have persistent stipules that have a length of 3 to 4 mm (0.12 to 0.16 in). Like most species of Acacia it has phyllodes rather than true leaves. The hairy and leathery evergreen phyllodes are patent to inclined and have a narrowly linear to oblanceolate-linear shape and are usually incurved with a length of 3.5 to 5.5 cm (1.4 to 2.2 in) and a width of 2 to 3.5 mm (0.079 to 0.138 in) and have six distant and raised nerves. It is thought to bloom in July when it produces simple inflorescences that occur in pairs in the axils with spherical flower-heads that have a 5 mm (0.20 in) diameter and containing 17 to 18 yellow flowers. Following flowering hairy and leathery seed pods form that have a flexuose-linearshape with a length of up to 20 m (66 ft) and a width of 2 mm (0.079 in). The glossy tan coloured seeds inside have an oval to elliptic shape with a length of 1.5 to 2 mm (0.059 to 0.079 in).

== Taxonomy ==
It was first formally described by the botanists Richard Sumner Cowan and Bruce Maslin in 1990 as a part of the work Acacia Miscellany. Some new microneurous taxa of Western Australia related to A. multineata (Leguminosae: Mimosoideae: Section Plurinerves) from Western Australia as published in the journal Nuytsia. It was reclassified as Racosperma torticarpum by Leslie Pedley in 2003 then transferred back to genus Acacia in 2006. It is similar in appearance to Acacia caesariata.

== Distribution ==
It is native to an area in the Wheatbelt region of Western Australia. It has a limited and disjunct distribution nd is only known from two populations near Yorkrakine and about 120 km (75 mi) further south around South Kumminin.

== See also ==
- List of Acacia species
