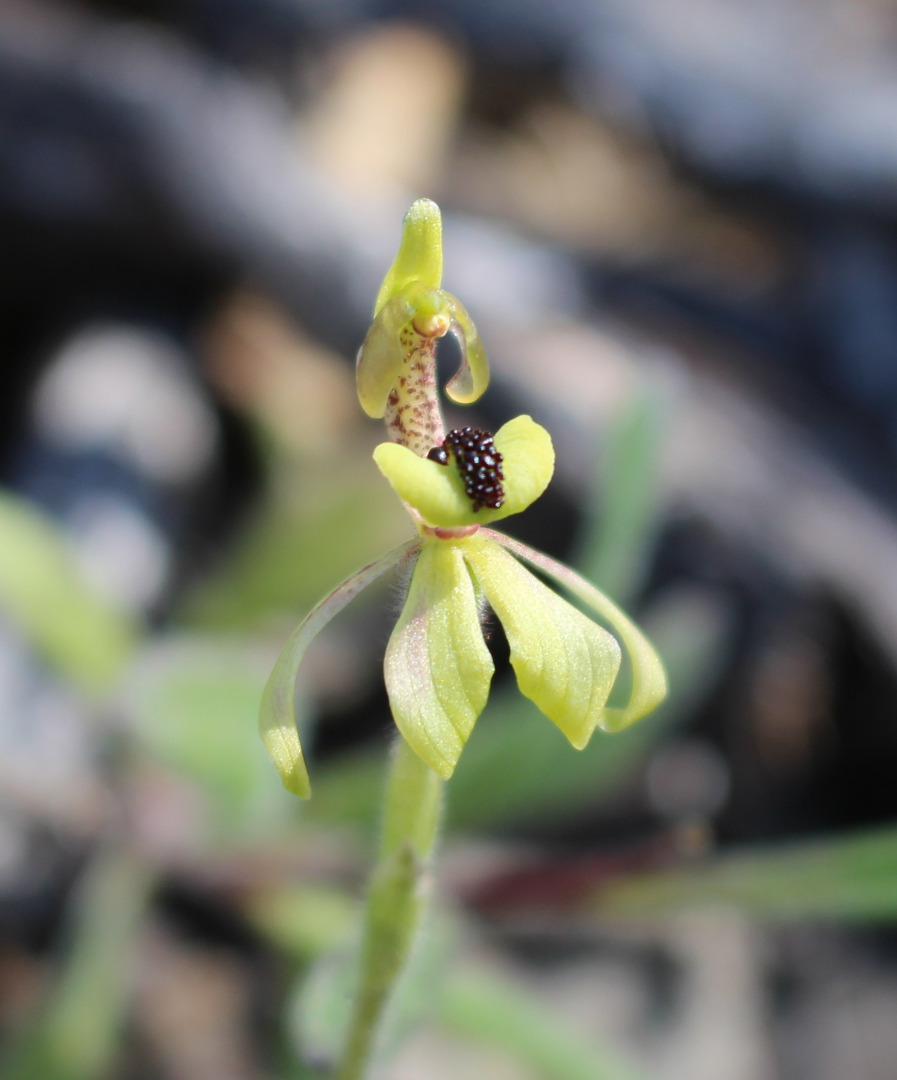
- In Stirling Range National Park

Scientific classification
- Kingdom: Plantae
- Clade: Tracheophytes
- Clade: Angiosperms
- Clade: Monocots
- Order: Asparagales
- Family: Orchidaceae
- Subfamily: Orchidoideae
- Tribe: Diurideae
- Genus: Caladenia
- Species: C. bryceana

Binomial name
- Caladenia bryceana R.S.Rogers

Synonyms
- Arachnorchis bryceana (R.S.Rogers) D.L.Jones & M.A.Clem.; Phlebochilus bryceana (R.S.Rogers) Szlach.; Phlebochilus bryceanum Hopper & A.P.Br. orth. var.

= Caladenia bryceana =

Species of orchid

Caladenia bryceana is a species of flowering plant in the orchid family Orchidaceae and is endemic to the south-west of Western Australia. It is a dwarf spider orchid with a single spreading, hairy leaf and a single green to apricot-coloured flower. There are two subspecies differing in the features of the labellum.

== Description ==
Caladenia bryceana is a terrestrial, perennial, deciduous, herb with an underground tuber and a single hairy leaf 40–80 mm (1.6–3.1 in) long and 5–12 mm (0.20–0.47 in) wide. Usually, there is only a single pale green to apricot-coloured flower. The dorsal sepal is erect to slightly curved forwards 8–22 mm (0.31–0.87 in) long and 1.5–2.0 mm (0.059–0.079 in) wide, the lateral sepals broadly crescent-moon shaped, 7–10 mm (0.28–0.39 in) long and 2–3 mm (0.079–0.118 in) wide, and the petals linear, 9–11 mm (0.35–0.43 in) long and 1.0–1.5 mm (0.039–0.059 in) long. The labellum is two-tone green and ends in a dark maroon tip, with a dense band of tall calli along the centre of the labellum but ending short of the maroon tip. Flowering occurs from August to October.

== Taxonomy and naming ==
Caladenia bryceana was first formally described by Richard Rogers in 1914 from a specimen collected near Gnowangerup. The description was published in Transactions and Proceedings of the Royal Society of South Australia). The specific epithet (bryceana) honours Frances Bryce MacIntyre.

In 2001, Noel Hoffman and Andrew Brown described two subspecies of C. bryceana in the journal Nuytsia, and the names are accepted by the Australian Plant Census:

- Caladenia bryceana R.S.Rogers subsp. bryceana - dwarf spider orchid, has its labellum calli in a continuous band.
- Caladenia bryceana subsp. cracens Hopper & A.P.Br. - northern dwarf spider orchid, has it calli with a gap, usually in the middle of the band.

== Distribution and habitat ==
This spider orchid grows along watercourses and in winter-west place in two widely disjunct populations in the Esperance Plains, Geraldton Sandplains, Jarrah Forest and Mallee bioregions of south-western Western Australia.
