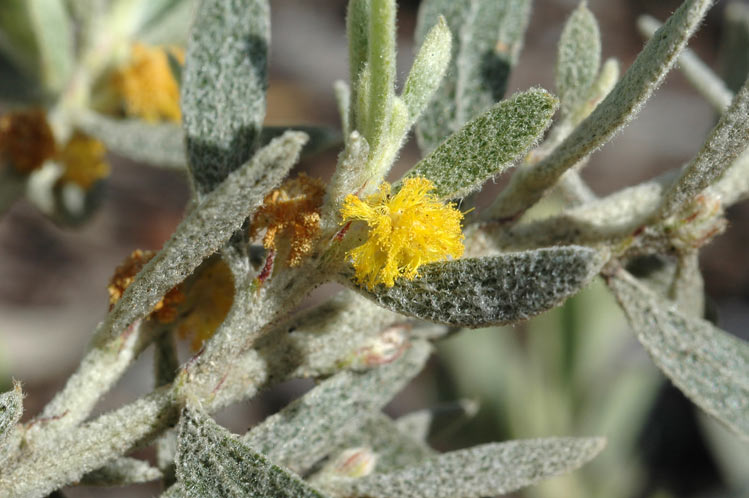

Conservation status
- Endangered (EPBC Act)

Scientific classification
- Kingdom: Plantae
- Clade: Embryophytes
- Clade: Tracheophytes
- Clade: Spermatophytes
- Clade: Angiosperms
- Clade: Eudicots
- Clade: Rosids
- Order: Fabales
- Family: Fabaceae
- Subfamily: Caesalpinioideae
- Clade: Mimosoid clade
- Genus: Acacia
- Species: A. lanuginophylla

Binomial name
- Acacia lanuginophylla R.S.Cowan & Maslin
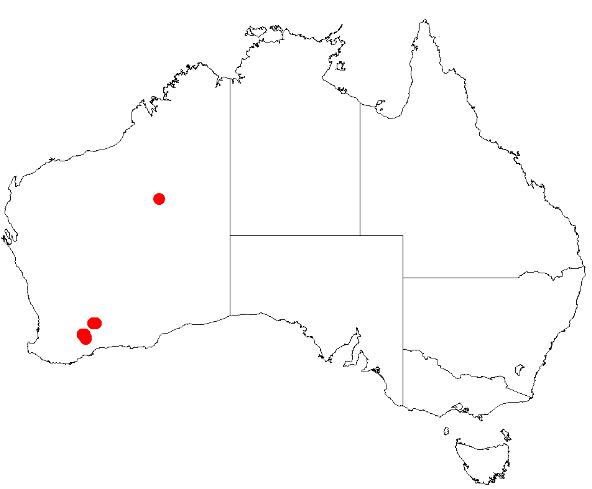
- Occurrence data from Australasian Virtual Herbarium

Synonyms
- Acacia lanuginosa C.A.Gardner nom. illeg.; Racosperma lanuginophyllum (R.S.Cowan & Maslin) Pedley

= Acacia lanuginophylla =

Woolly wattle

Species of legume

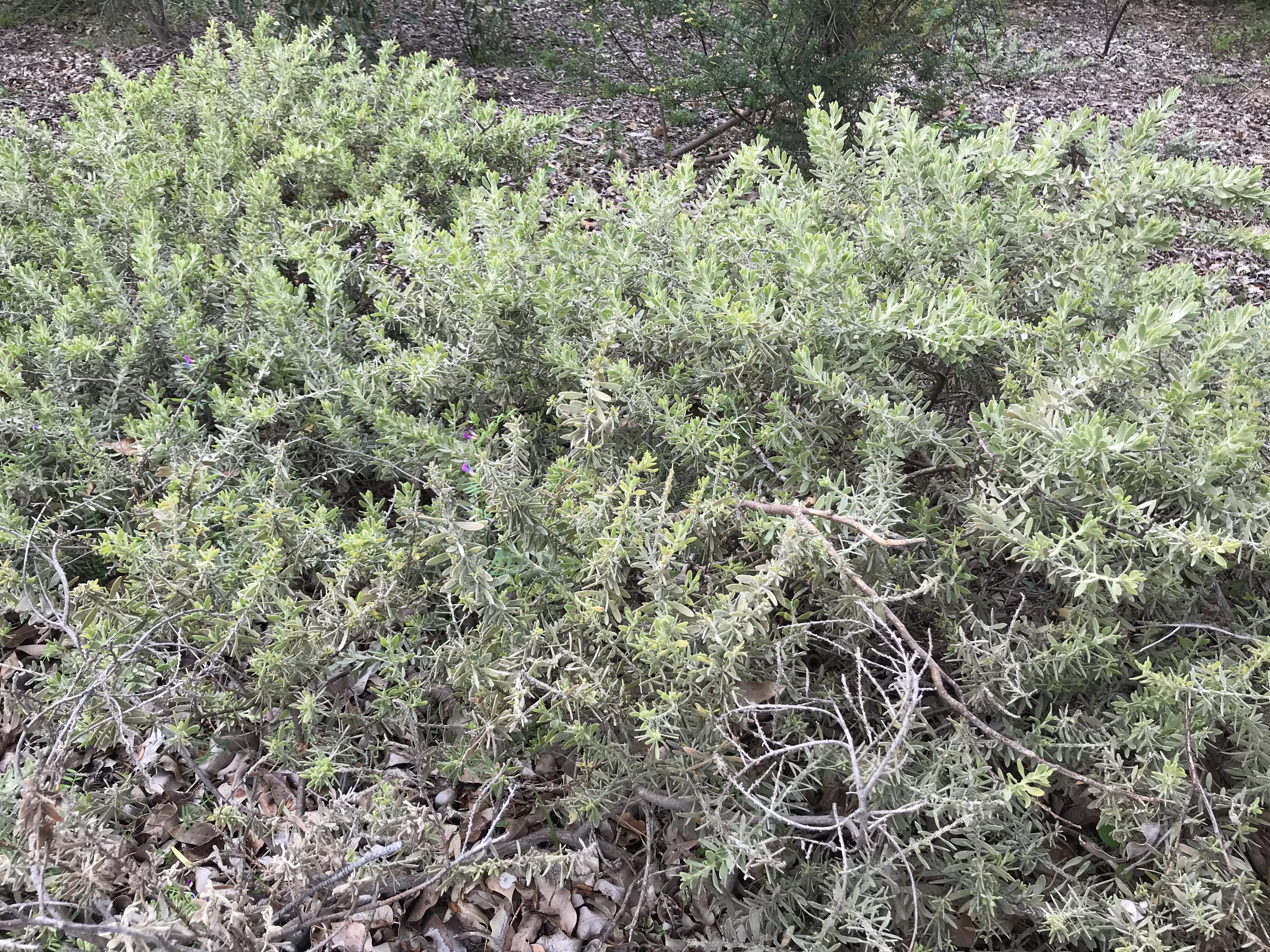
Habit in Kings Park Botanic Gardens

Acacia lanuginophylla or woolly wattle, is a species of flowering plant in the family Fabaceae and is endemic to a small area in the south-west of Western Australia. It is a dense shrub with branchlets densely covered with woolly white hairs, narrowly elliptic to narrowly oblong phyllodes, spherical heads of golden yellow flowers, and oblong, thinly crusty pods, densely covered with woolly white hairs.

== Description ==
Acacia lanuginophylla is a dense to open, domed, erect or spreading shrub that typically grows to a height of 0.5–1.2 m (2–4 ft) and has its branchlets densely covered with woolly white hairs. Its phyllodes are narrowly elliptic to narrowly oblong, 15–40 mm (0.59–1.57 in) long, 3.5–10 mm (0.14–0.39 in) wide, greyish green with three main veins and densely covered with woolly white hairs. There is a gland 2–6 mm (0.079–0.236 in) above the pulvinus. Flowering occurs from July to October, and the pods are oblong, up to 25 mm (0.98 in) long, 6–7 mm (0.24–0.28 in) wide, thinly crusty and densely covered with woolly white hairs. The seeds are about 3 mm (0.12 in) long and tan with an aril near the end.

== Taxonomy ==
Acacia lanuginophylla was first formally described in 1990 by Richard Sumner Cowan and Bruce Maslin in the journal Nuytsia, based on Charles Gardner's 1939 description in Hooker's Icones Plantarum of specimens collected on Mount Holland. The specific epithet (lanuginophylla) means 'wool-leaved'.

== Distribution and habitat ==
Woolly wattle grows along drainage lines on flats in san or gravelly soils in low, open scrub and is only known from near Lake Biddy north of Newdegate and Lake Lockhart, about 30 km (19 mi) south, in the Coolgardie and Mallee bioregions of south-western Western Australia.

== Conservation status ==
Acacia lanuginophylla is listed as 'Threatened' by the Western Australian Government Department of Biodiversity, Conservation and Attractions, meaning that it is in danger of extinction, 'Vulnerable' under the World Conservation Union (IUCN 2001) Red List and 'Endangered' under the Australian Government Environment Protection and Biodiversity Conservation Act 1999 A national recovery plan has been prepared. There are only nine remaining populations or fifteen subpopulations of the plant remaining with an estimated 5,483 individuals remaining that are found in the Shire of Lake Grace and Shire of Yilgarn where over 75% of the native vegetation has been cleared.

== See also ==
- List of Acacia species
