= Eremophila verticillata =

Whorled eremophila

Conservation status
- Endangered (EPBC Act)

Scientific classification
- Kingdom: Plantae
- Clade: Embryophytes
- Clade: Tracheophytes
- Clade: Spermatophytes
- Clade: Angiosperms
- Clade: Eudicots
- Clade: Asterids
- Order: Lamiales
- Family: Scrophulariaceae
- Genus: Eremophila
- Species: E. verticillata

Binomial name
- Eremophila verticillata Chinnock

Species of flowering plant

Eremophila verticillata, commonly known as whorled eremophila, is a flowering plant in the figwort family, Scrophulariaceae and is endemic to Western Australia. It is a low, spreading or rounded shrub with a strong odour, small leaves pressed against the stem and purple flowers. It is a rare plant, partly due to land clearing.

== Description ==
Eremophila verticillata is a rounded or spreading shrub which grows to a height of between 0.4 and 1.5 m (1 and 5 ft) with a strong, slightly offensive odour and more or less hairy branches. The leaves are arranged on whorls of 3 around the branches, alternating with the whorls above and below. The leaves are pressed against the branches and are fleshy, glabrous, oblong-shaped, green to purplish in colour, 2.5–6 mm (0.1–0.2 in) long and about 1 mm (0.04 in) wide.

The flowers are borne singly in leaf axils and lack a stalk. There are usually 4 green, linear to lance-shaped, more or less hairy sepals which are 1–5 mm (0.04–0.2 in) long. The petals are mostly 8–11 mm (0.3–0.4 in) long and are joined at their lower end to form a tube. The petal tube is light purple outside and white with purple spots inside. The outer surfaces of the petal tube and its lobes are hairy and the inside of the tube and the lower lobe are covered with long hairs while the other lobes are glabrous. The 4 stamens are fully enclosed in the petal tube. Flowering occurs between November and January and is followed by fruits which are dry, woody, oval-shaped with a pointed end and 2–3 mm (0.08–0.1 in) long with a hairy covering.

== Taxonomy and naming ==
The species was first formally described by Robert Chinnock in 1986 and the description was published in Nuytsia. The specific epithet is from the Latin verticillata, 'whorled', referring to the leaf arrangement.

== Distribution and habitat ==
Whorled eremophila grows in loam over limestone in woodland near Newdegate in the Mallee biogeographic region. It used to occur between Kalgarin and Pingaring but that population is thought to have become extinct due to land clearing in 1980.

== Conservation ==
Eremophila verticillata is classified as "Threatened Flora (Declared Rare Flora — Extant)" by the Department of Environment and Conservation (Western Australia). It is listed as "Endangered" (EN) under the Australian Government Environment Protection and Biodiversity Conservation Act 1999 (EPBC Act) and an interim recovery plan has been prepared. In 2003, the total population of E. verticillata was estimated to be 567 mature plants. Mining, vehicle damage and weed invasion are some of the perceived threats to the remaining populations.

== Use in horticulture ==
Some specimens of this species have been in cultivation for more than 30 years and its hardiness indicate its potential in a low maintenance garden. It also makes a valuable container plant. Propagation from cuttings is relatively easy and the shrub will grow in a wide range of soils, including those that are slightly saline or based on clay. It performs well in full sun or part shade, is very frost tolerant and usually does not need watering, even during a long drought.
