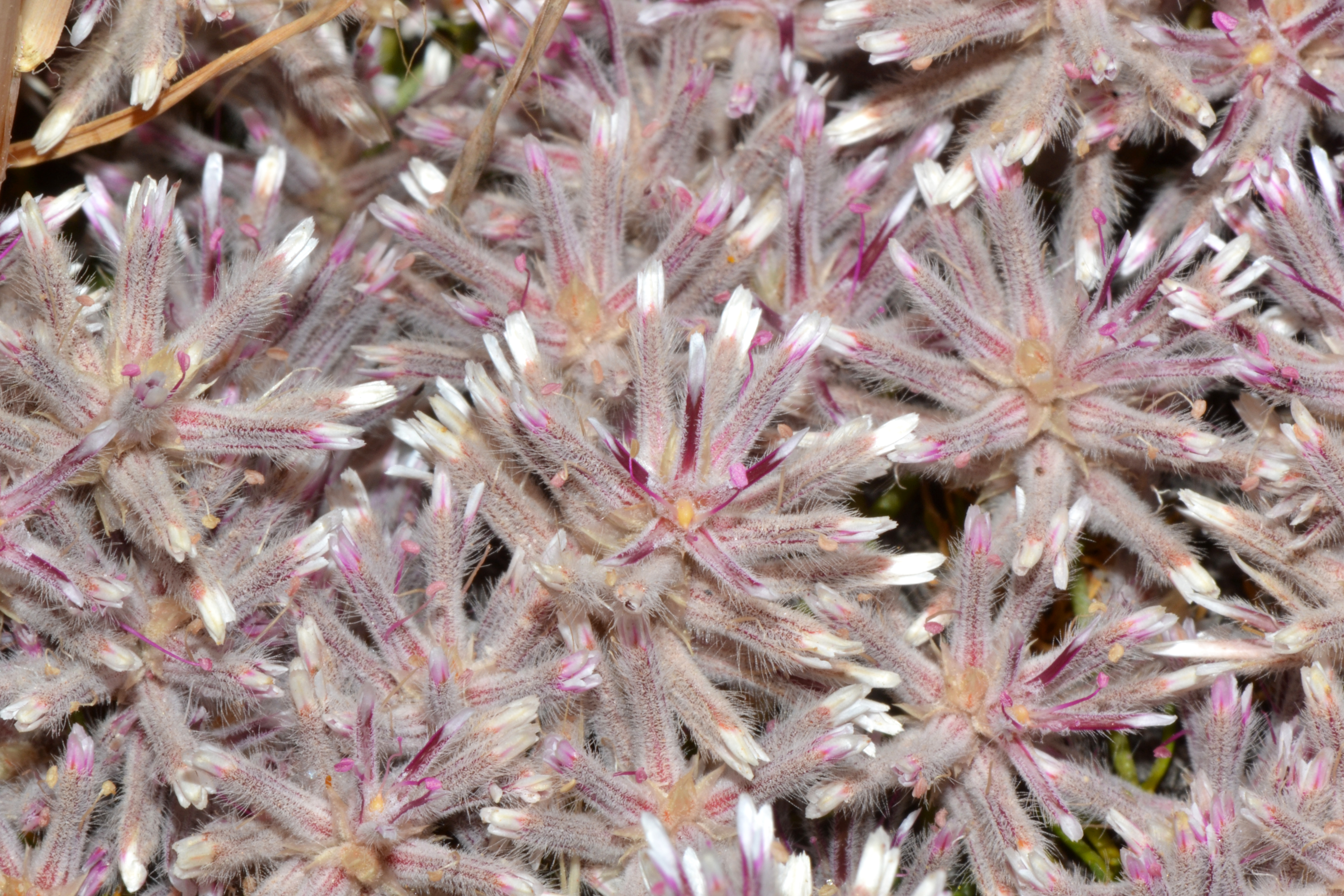

Conservation status
- Priority Four — Rare Taxa (DEC)

Scientific classification
- Kingdom: Plantae
- Clade: Tracheophytes
- Clade: Angiosperms
- Clade: Eudicots
- Order: Caryophyllales
- Family: Amaranthaceae
- Genus: Ptilotus
- Species: P. fasciculatus

Binomial name
- Ptilotus fasciculatus W.Fitzg.

= Ptilotus fasciculatus =

Species of grass-like plant

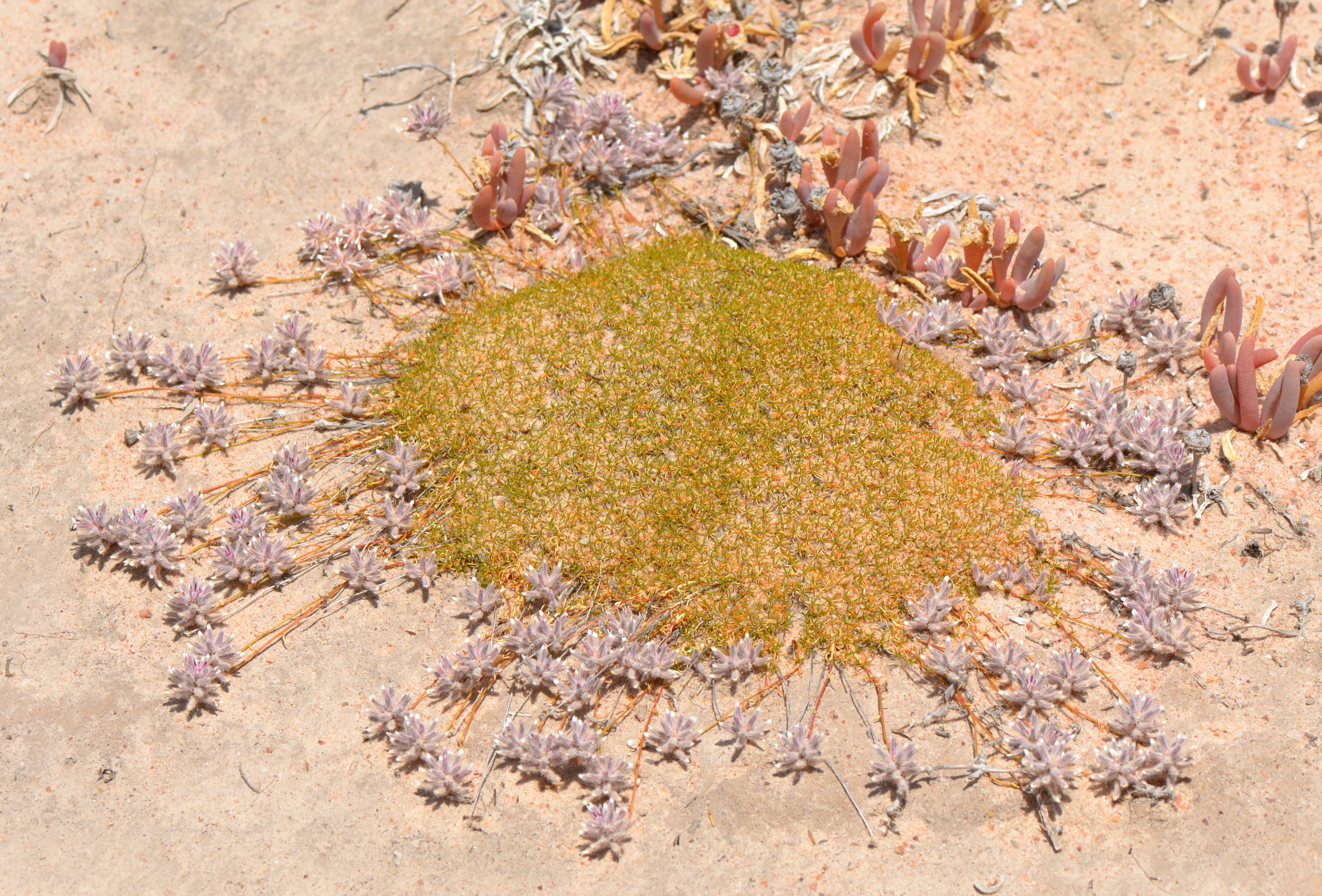
Habit near Quaraiding

Ptilotus fasciculatus is a species of flowering plant in the family Amaranthaceae and is endemic to the south-west of Western Australia. It is a more or less prostrate, perennial herb with several hairy stems, linear stem leaves and spikes of pink or magenta flowers.

== Description ==
Ptilotus fasciculatus is a prostrate perennial herb with several hairy stems. The leaves on the stems are linear, 3–10 mm (0.12–0.39 in) long and 0.5–1 mm (0.020–0.039 in) wide. There are bracts 4.5–4.8 mm (0.18–0.19 in) long bracteoles 4.9–5.7 mm (0.19–0.22 in) long with a prominent midrib. The flowers are pink or magenta and borne in oval, hemispherical or spherical spikes, the outer tepals 13–14.8 mm (0.51–0.58 in) long, the inner tepals 12–14.2 mm (0.47–0.56 in) long. The style is 5.3 mm (0.21 in) long and fixed to the side of the ovary.

== Taxonomy ==
Ptilotus fasciculatus was first formally described in 1912 by William Vincent Fitzgerald in the Journal of Botany, British and Foreign from specimens he collected near Cunderdin in 1907. The specific epithet (fasciculatus) means 'clustered', referring to the leaves.

== Distribution ==
This species of Ptilotus grows in the Avon Wheatbelt, Geraldton Sandplains and Mallee bioregions of south-western Western Australia.

== Conservation status ==
Ptilotus falcatus is listed as "Priority Four" by the Government of Western Australia Department of Biodiversity, Conservation and Attractions, meaning that it is known from only one or a few locations where it is potentially at risk.

== See also ==
- List of Ptilotus species
