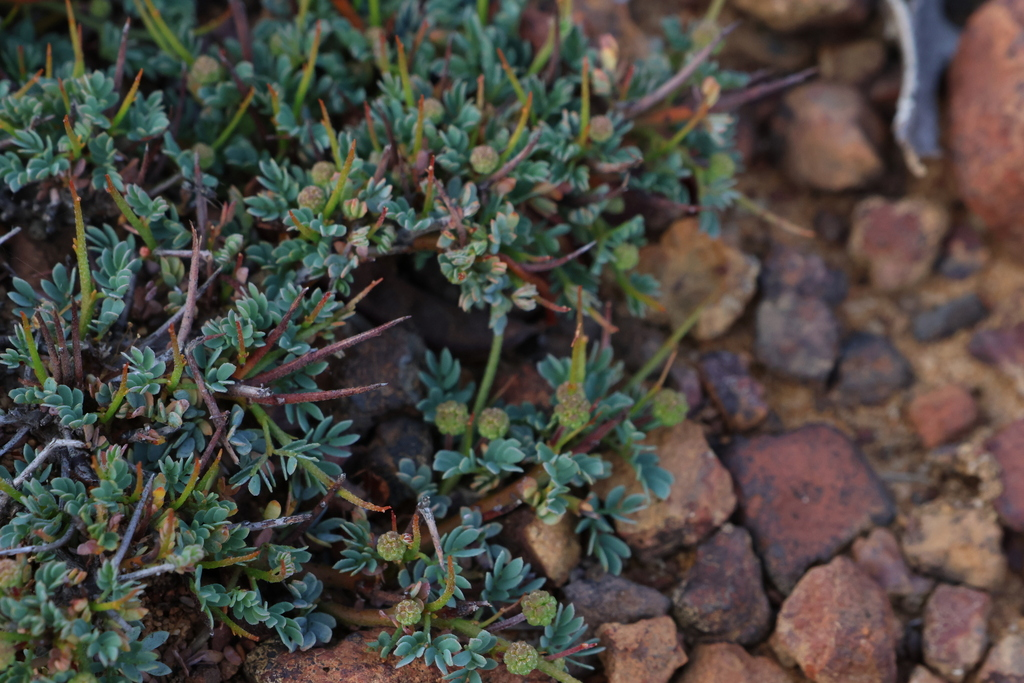

Conservation status
- Vulnerable (EPBC Act)

Scientific classification
- Kingdom: Plantae
- Clade: Tracheophytes
- Clade: Angiosperms
- Clade: Eudicots
- Clade: Rosids
- Order: Fabales
- Family: Fabaceae
- Subfamily: Caesalpinioideae
- Clade: Mimosoid clade
- Genus: Acacia
- Species: A. depressa

Binomial name
- Acacia depressa Maslin
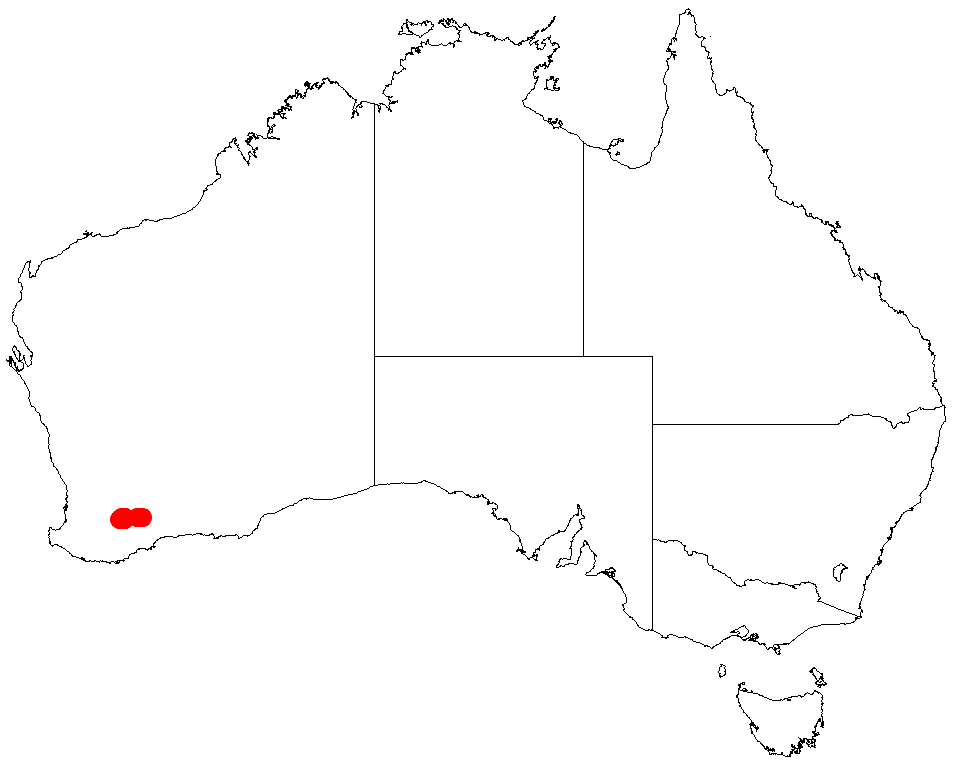
- Occurrence data from AVH

Synonyms
- Acacia echinata Maslin nom. illeg.; Racosperma depressum (Maslin) Pedley

= Acacia depressa =

Echidna wattle

Species of plant

Acacia depressa, commonly known as echidna wattle, is a species of flowering plant in the family Fabaceae and is endemic to a small area in the south-west of Western Australia. It is a dense, prostrate, prickly shrub with more or less glabrous, bipinnate leaves, spherical heads of light golden yellow flowers and narrowly oblong, firmly papery pods.

== Description ==
Acacia depressa is a dense, prostrate, prickly, mat-forming shrub that typically grows to 5 cm (0.2 ft) high and 50 cm (20 in) wide and has spiny branchlets with soft hairs pressed against the surface. The leaves are bipinnate and more or less glabrous with one pair of pinnae 2–4 mm (0.079–0.157 in) long, each pinna with 3 to 4 pairs of narrowly oblong to oblong pinnules 2–3 mm (0.079–0.118 in) long and about 1 mm (0.039 in) wide. The flowers are borne in a spherical head in axils on a peduncle 10–20 mm (0.39–0.79 in) long, each head 3–4 mm (0.12–0.16 in) in diameter with 12 to 15 light golden yellow flowers. Flowering occurs in December and January, and the pods are narrowly oblong, 10–20 mm (0.39–0.79 in) long, about 3 mm (0.12 in) wide and more or less firmly papery.

== Taxonomy ==
This species was first formally described in 1972 by Bruce Maslin, who gave it the name Acacia echinata in the journal Nuytsia from specimens collected "6 mi (9.7 km) east of Kukerin" by Kenneth Newbey in 1964, but that name was illegitimate because it was used for a separate taxon named by George Don. In 1975, Maslin changed the name to Acacia depressa in a later edition of the same journal. The specific epithet (depressa) means 'pressed down', referring to the low habit of this species.

== Distribution and habitat ==
Echidna wattle is restricted to an area around Lake Grace in the mallee bioregion of Western Australia, where it usually grows on low rocky hills and rises in gravelly lateritic soils, in low shrubland or open heath.

== Conservation status ==
Acacia depressa is listed as "vulnerable" under the Australian Government Environment Protection and Biodiversity Conservation Act 1999, and as "threatened" under the Western Australian Government Biodiversity Conservation Act 2016.

== See also ==
- List of Acacia species
