= Goodenia integerrima =

Gypsum goodenia

Conservation status
- Declared rare (DEC)

Scientific classification
- Kingdom: Plantae
- Clade: Tracheophytes
- Clade: Angiosperms
- Clade: Eudicots
- Clade: Asterids
- Order: Asterales
- Family: Goodeniaceae
- Genus: Goodenia
- Species: G. integerrima

Binomial name
- Goodenia integerrima Carolin

Species of plant

Goodenia integerrima, commonly known as gypsum goodenia, is a species of flowering plant in the family Goodeniaceae and is endemic to the south-west of Western Australia. It is a low-lying to ascending, perennial herb with linear leaves clustered on the stems, and umbels of yellow flowers with a brownish centre.

== Description ==
Goodenia integerrima is a low-lying to ascending perennial herb with stems about 9 cm (3.5 in) long. The leaves are linear, clustered on the stems, up to 70 mm (2.8 in) long and 1–2 mm (0.039–0.079 in) wide. The flowers are arranged in umbels up to 80 mm (3.1 in) long with leaf-like bracts, each flower on a pedicel about 5 mm (0.20 in) long. The sepals are narrow triangular, about 3 mm (0.12 in) long, the flowers yellow with a brownish centre, about 7 mm (0.28 in) long. The lower lobes of the corolla are about 2 mm (0.079 in) long with wings about 1 mm (0.039 in) wide. Flowering occurs about November and the fruit is more or less spherical capsule about 1.5 mm (0.059 in) in diameter.

== Taxonomy and naming ==
Goodenia integerrima was first formally described in 1990 by Roger Charles Carolin in the journal Telopea from material collected in 1965 by Alex George near Lake King. The specific epithet (integerrima) means "undivided", referring to the leaves.

== Distribution and habitat ==
This goodenia grows on elevated sandy islets in salt lakes near Lake King in the south-west of Western Australia.

== Conservation status ==
Goodenia integerrimais classified as "Threatened Flora (Declared Rare Flora — Extant)" by the Department of Environment and Conservation (Western Australia) and an Interim Recovery Plan has been prepared.
