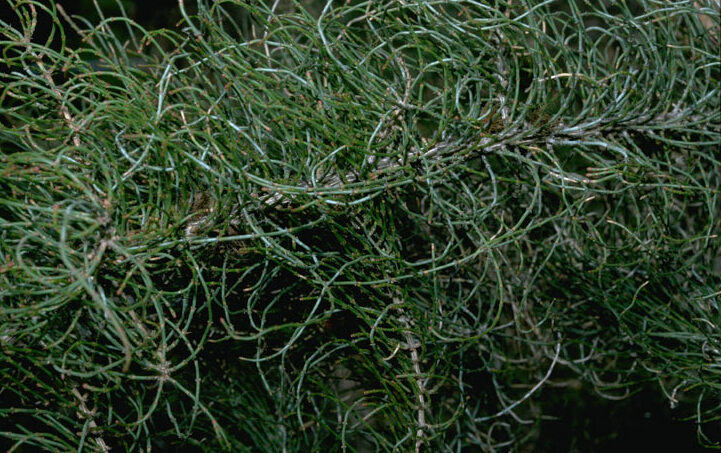
- In Kings Park

Conservation status
- Declared rare (DEC)

Scientific classification
- Kingdom: Plantae
- Clade: Tracheophytes
- Clade: Angiosperms
- Clade: Eudicots
- Clade: Rosids
- Order: Fagales
- Family: Casuarinaceae
- Genus: Allocasuarina
- Species: A. tortiramula

Binomial name
- Allocasuarina tortiramula E.M.Benn.

= Allocasuarina tortiramula =

Species of flowering plant

Allocasuarina tortiramula, commonly known as twisted sheoak, is a species of flowering plant in the family Casuarinaceae and is endemic to a restricted area in the south-west of Western Australia. It is a dioecious shrub that has spreading, twisted branchlets, the leaves reduced to scales in whorls of seven, the mature fruiting cones 10–15 mm (0.39–0.59 in) long containing winged seeds 5.5–6.0 mm (0.22–0.24 in) long.

== Description ==
Allocasuarina tortiramula is a dioecious shrub that typically grows to a height of up to about 1.7 m (5 ft 7 in). Its branchlets are spreading and twisted, up to about 100 mm (3.9 in) long, the leaves reduced to scale-like teeth arranged in whorls of seven, around the branchlets. The sections of branchlet between the leaf whorls are 6–10 mm (0.24–0.39 in) long and 0.8–1 mm (0.031–0.039 in) wide. Male flowers are arranged in dense spikes 5–9 mm (0.20–0.35 in) long, the anthers 1.1–1.2 mm (0.043–0.047 in) long. Female cones are sessile, mature cones 10–15 mm (0.39–0.59 in) long and about 10 mm (0.39 in) in diameter, the winged seeds brown and 5.5–6.0 mm (0.22–0.24 in) long.

== Taxonomy ==
Allocasuarina tortiramula was first formally described in 1989 by Eleanor Marion Bennett in the Flora of Australia from specimens collected near Lake King in 1987. The specific epithet (tortiramula) means "twisted branchlet".

== Distribution and habitat ==
Twisted sheoak is only known from two populations growing in and near a nature reserve to the west of Lake King, where it grows in dense, tall heath.

== Conservation status ==
Allocasuarina tortiramula is listed as "threatened" in Western Australia.
