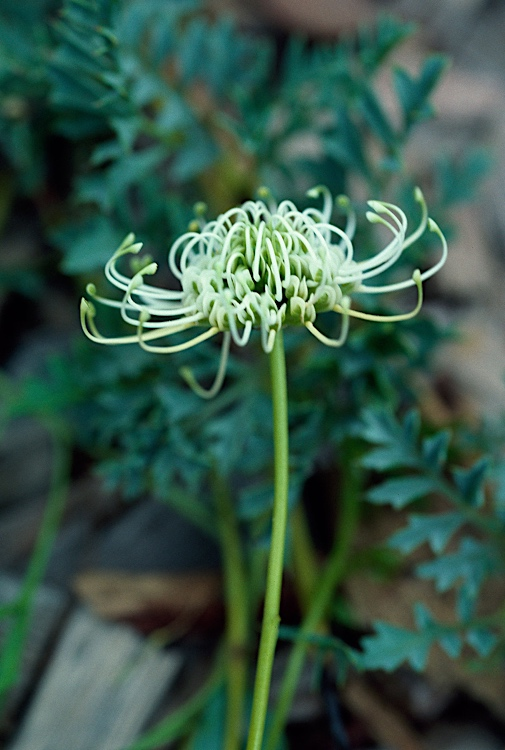
- In Illawarra Grevillea Park

Conservation status
- Endangered (EPBC Act)

Scientific classification
- Kingdom: Plantae
- Clade: Tracheophytes
- Clade: Angiosperms
- Clade: Eudicots
- Order: Proteales
- Family: Proteaceae
- Genus: Grevillea
- Species: G. scapigera

Binomial name
- Grevillea scapigera A.S.George

= Grevillea scapigera =

Species of shrub endemic to Western Australia

Grevillea scapigera, commonly known as Corrigin grevillea, is a species of flowering plant in the family Proteaceae and is endemic to a small area of the south-west of Western Australia. It is a prostrate to weakly ascending, suckering shrub with divided leaves, the end lobes broadly triangular and sharply-pointed, and spikes of white to cream-coloured flowers held above the foliage.

== Description ==
Grevillea scapigera is a suckering, prostrate, spreading to weakly ascending shrub that typically grows to 0.15–0.4 m (5.9 in – 1 ft 3.7 in) high and 1.8–2.0 m (5 ft 11 in – 6 ft 7 in) wide. Its leaves are 3–7.5 cm (1.2–3.0 in) long and pinnatipartite to pinnatisect with 5 to 11 egg-shaped to wedge-shaped leaflets that have 3 to 7 further divisions. The end lobes are broadly triangular and sharply-pointed. Both surfaces of the leaves are glabrous when mature, sometimes glaucous, have a slightly leathery texture, and have slightly thickened edges. The flowers are borne on a flowering stem up to 40 cm (16 in) long held above the leaves in an umbel-like or hemispherical cluster up to 4 cm (1.6 in) in diameter, on a rachis 5–8 mm (0.20–0.31 in) long, the flowers at the base opening first. The flowers are sweetly-scented, green at first, turning white to cream-coloured as they open, with a white style, the pollen presenter greenish. The pistil is 15–19 mm (0.59–0.75 in) long and the ovary is glabrous. Flowering has been observed in October, November and February and the fruit is a sticky, elliptic follicle 10–13 mm (0.39–0.51 in) long containing mottled grey to light brown coloured seeds.

== Taxonomy ==
Grevillea scapigera was first formally described by the botanist Alexander Segger George in 1974 in the journal Nuytsia, from specimens collected between Corrigin and Quairading by Clive Vincent Malcolm in 1960. The specific epithet (scapigera) means "flower-stalk bearing".

== Distribution and habitat ==
Corrigin grevillea is found in a small area centred around the town of Corrigin from south of Quairading in the west to about halfway between Corrigin and Kwolyin in the north out as far as Hyden in the east and about halfway between Corrigin and Yealering in the south. All the known populations have a total range of approximately 40 km (25 mi) and are often found along degraded road verges on flat country as a part of tall shrubland or low heathland communities. It is mostly found growing in gravelly to sandy lateritic soils.

== Conservation status ==
Grevillea scapigera is listed as "endangered" under the Australian Government Environment Protection and Biodiversity Conservation Act 1999 and as "threatened" by the Western Australian Government Department of Biodiversity, Conservation and Attractions. The main threats to the species include its lack of critical habitat, habitat fragmentation, seed predation, weed invasion, browsing by rabbits, and salinity.

== See also ==
- List of Grevillea species
