= Acacia caesariata =

Conservation status
- Declared rare (DEC)

Scientific classification
- Kingdom: Plantae
- Clade: Tracheophytes
- Clade: Angiosperms
- Clade: Eudicots
- Clade: Rosids
- Order: Fabales
- Family: Fabaceae
- Subfamily: Caesalpinioideae
- Clade: Mimosoid clade
- Genus: Acacia
- Species: A. caesariata

Binomial name
- Acacia caesariata R.S.Cowan & Maslin
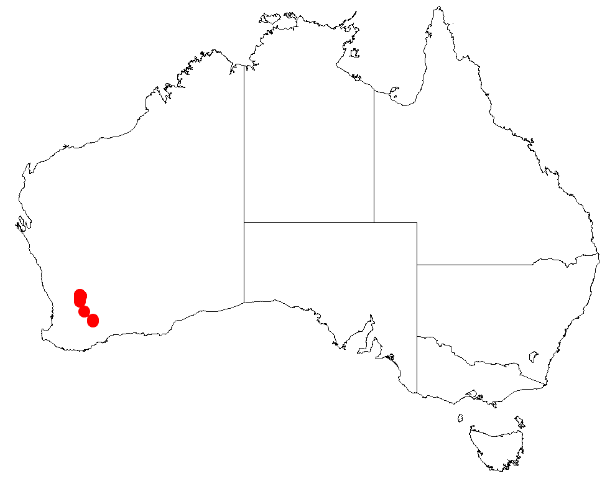
- Occurrence data from AVH

Synonymsref name="APC" />
- Acacia aff. multilineata (B.R.Maslin 3405); Racosperma caesariatum (R.S.Cowan & Maslin) Pedley

Species of legume

Acacia caesariata is a species of flowering plant in the family Fabaceae and is endemic to inland Western Australia. It is a dense, rounded, erect or semi-prostrate shrub with narrowly elliptic to lance-shaped phyllodes with the narrower end towards the base, spherical heads of light- to mid-golden yellow flowers, and linear pods.

== Description ==
Acacia caesariata is a dense, rounded, erected or semi-prostrate shrub that typically grows to a height of 0.6–1.6 m (2 ft 0 in – 5 ft 3 in) and often has gnarled, side branches. The phyllodes are erect to ascending, more or less leathery, dull green to grey-green, 20–45 mm (0.79–1.77 in) long, 2–10 mm (0.079–0.394 in) wide and have three to five or more veins on each side and a gland up to 3 mm (0.12 in) above the base. There are stipules 1.5–4 mm (0.059–0.157 in) long at the base of the phyllodes. The flowers are borne in two spherical heads 4 mm (0.16 in) in diameter on a peduncle mostly 2–4 mm (0.079–0.157 in) long. Each head contains 18 to 20 light- to mid-golden yellow flowers with linear to narrowly oblong bracteoles at the base. Flowering occurs in August and September and the pods are curved, wavy or coiled and papery, up to 25 mm (0.98 in) long and 2.5–3 mm (0.098–0.118 in) wide, containing glossy black, elliptic or oblong seeds, 2.5–3 mm (0.098–0.118 in) long with a large, helmet-shaped aril on the end.

== Taxonomy ==
Acacia caesariata was first formally described in 1990 by Richard Cowan and Bruce Maslin in the journal Nuytsia from specimens collected by Maslin 30.5 km (19.0 mi) west of Kununoppin towards Wyalkatchem. The specific epithet (caesariata) means 'covered with hair', referring to the general hairiness of the plant.

== Description and habitat ==
This species of wattle has a disjunct distribution from around Kununoppin in the north to Lake Grace in the south where it grows in gritty clay and loam soils as a part of Eucalyptus woodland and mallee scrub communities in the Avon Wheatbelt and Mallee bioregions.

== Conservtion status ==
Acacia caesariata is listed as Threatened Flora (Declared Rare Flora — Extant) by the Government of Western Australia Department of Biodiversity, Conservation and Attractions, meaning it is rare, in danger of extinction, or otherwise in need of special protection.

== See also ==
- List of Acacia species
