= Mallee bioregion =

Biogeographic region in southern Western Australia

Coordinates: 33.231°S 118.603°E

Mallee
- Region
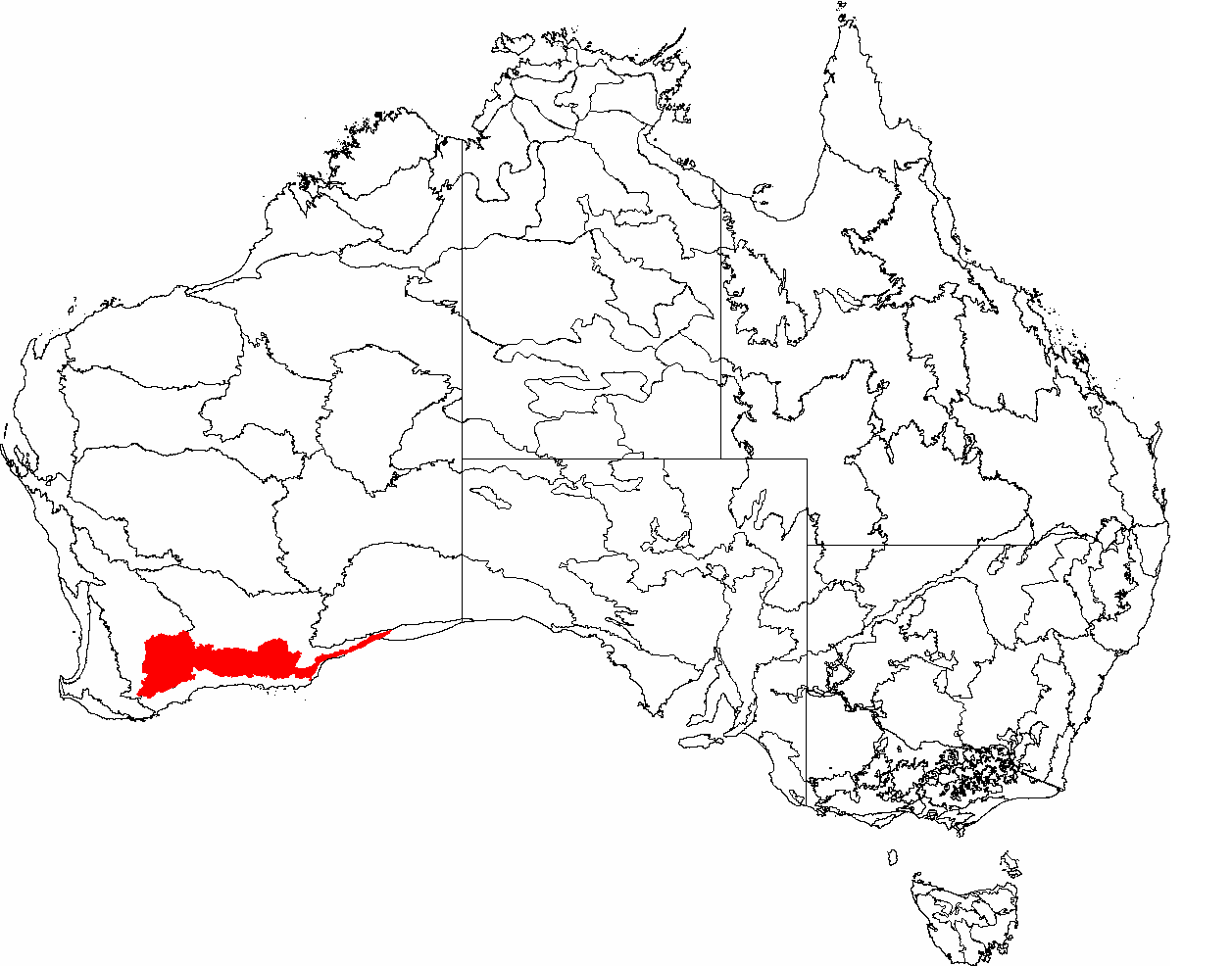
- The interim Australian bioregions, with Mallee in red
- Country: Australia
- State: Western Australia

Area
  - Total: 73,975.59 km^{2} (28,562.13 sq mi)
Localities around Mallee
Avon Wheatbelt	Coolgardie	Coolgardie
Avon Wheatbelt	Mallee	Hampton
Avon Wheatbelt	Esperance Plains	Esperance Plains

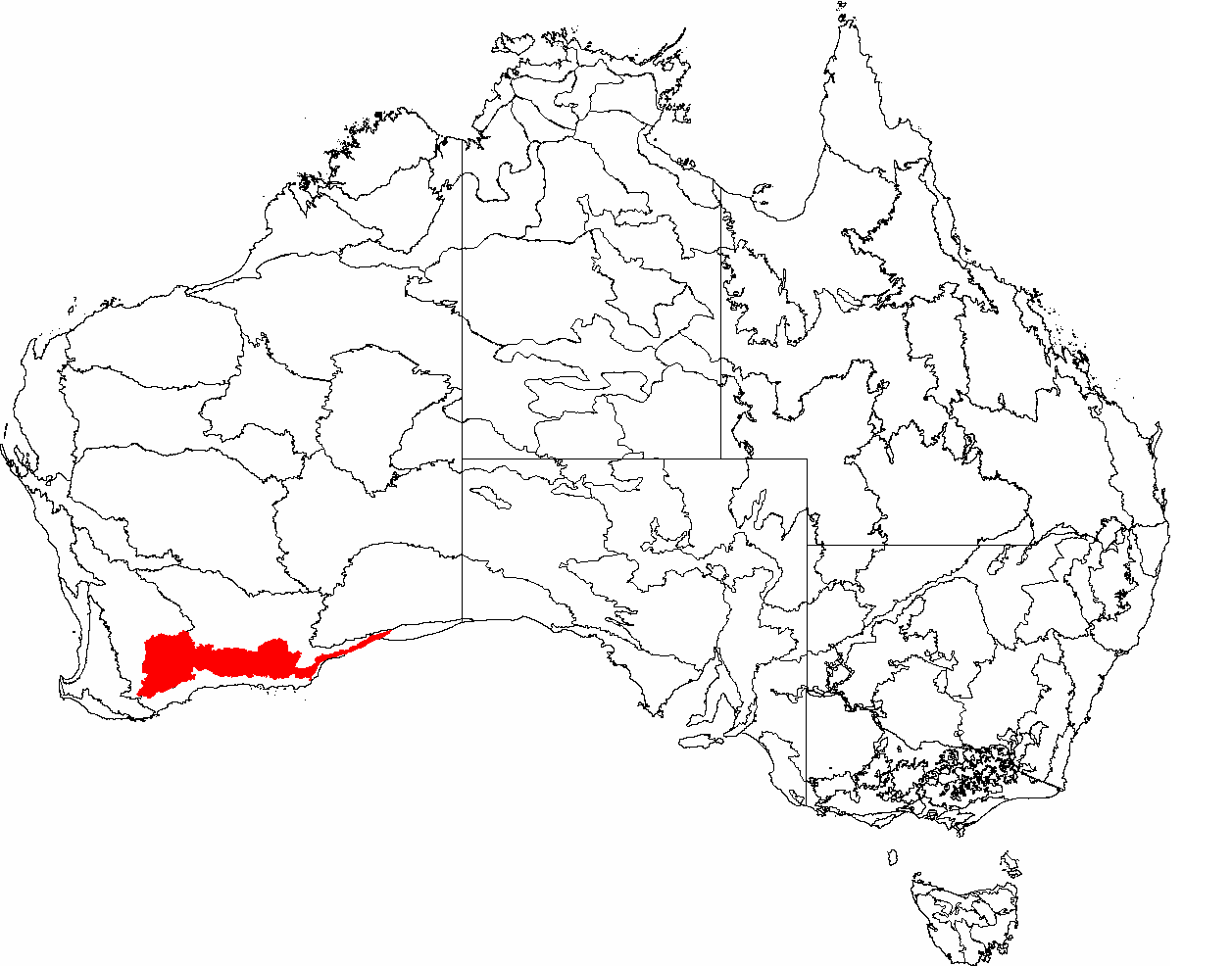
The IBRA regions, with Mallee in red

Mallee, also known as Roe Botanical District, is a biogeographic region in southern Western Australia. Located between the Esperance Plains, Avon Wheatbelt and Coolgardie bioregions, it has a low, gently undulating topography, a semi-arid mediterranean climate, and extensive Eucalyptus mallee vegetation. It has an area of 73,975.59 square kilometres (28,562.13 sq mi). About half of the region has been cleared for intensive agriculture. Recognised as a region under the Interim Biogeographic Regionalisation for Australia (IBRA), it was first defined by John Stanley Beard in 1980.

== Geography and geology ==
The Mallee region has a complex shape with tortuous boundaries, but may be roughly approximated as the triangular area south of a line from Bruce Rock to Eyre, but not within 40 kilometres (25 mi) of the south coast, except at its eastern limits. It has an area of about 79000 square kilometres (31000 mi^{2}), making it about a quarter of the South West Botanic Province, 3% of the state, and 1% of Australia. It is bounded to the south by the Esperance Plains region; to the west and northwest by the Avon Wheatbelt region; and to the east by the Coolgardie region.

There are a number of small towns in the west of the region, where wheat is grown. These include Gnowangerup, Lake Grace, Newdegate, Kondinin and Hyden. Also of note is the tourist attraction Wave Rock. Further east, the area is virtually uninhabited, except for Lake King, and a few small towns along the Coolgardie-Esperance Highway south of Norseman, such as Grass Patch and Salmon Gums.

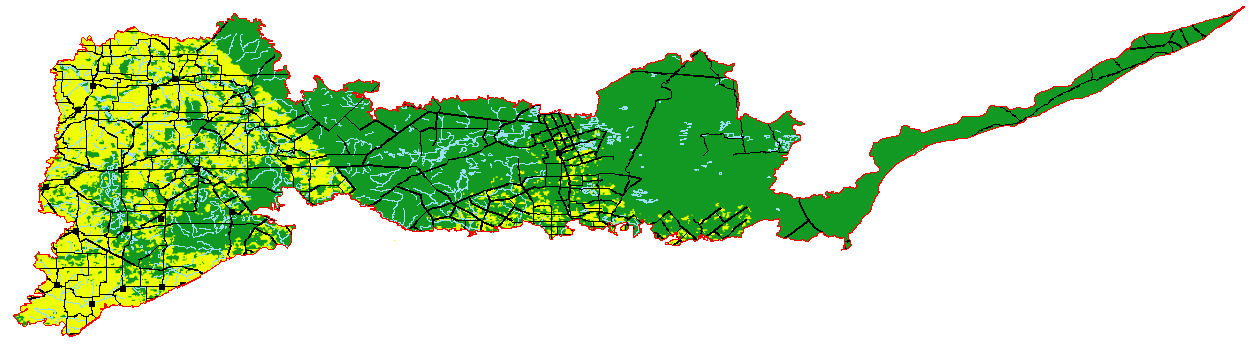
The Mallee region, with agricultural areas in yellow, and native vegetation in green

Most soil is sand over clay, overlying Archean and Proterozoic granite of the Yilgarn craton. At the eastern limits there is some calcareous soil overlying Eocene limestone. The region has a low, gently undulating topography, with somewhat occluded drainage, resulting in a series of playa lakes.

== Climate ==
Mallee is semi-arid, with a warm, dry, Mediterranean climate. It has seven to eight dry months. Rainfall in winter is typically between 300 and 500 millimetres (11½–19 in).

Climatic table for Salmon Gums, a town in the Mallee region
	Jan	Feb	Mar	Apr	May	Jun	Jul	Aug	Sep	Oct	Nov	Dec	Year
Mean daily maximum temperature	30.5°C; 86.9°F	29.5 °C; 85.1 °F	27.2 °C; 81.0 °F	23.5 °C; 74.3 °F	19.6 °C; 67.3 °F	16.8 °C; 62.2 °F	16.0 °C; 60.8 °F	17.2 °C; 63.0 °F	20.4 °C; 68.7 °F	23.2 °C; 73.8 °F	26.1 °C; 79.0 °F	28.9 °C; 84.0 °F	23.2 °C; 73.8 °F
Mean daily minimum temperature	14.0 °C; 57.2 °F	14.2 °C; 57.6 °F	12.7 °C; 54.9 °F	10.0 °C; 50.0 °F	7.2 °C; 45.0 °F	5.6 °C; 42.1 °F	4.6 °C; 40.3 °F	4.7 °C; 40.5 °F	5.8 °C; 42.4 °F	7.5 °C; 45.5 °F	10.1 °C; 50.2 °F	12.3 °C; 54.1 °F	9.0 °C; 48.2 °F
Mean total rainfall	19.3 mm 0.7 in	23.4 mm 0.9 in	23.1 mm 0.9 in	26.0 mm 1.0 in	35.1 mm 1.4 in	40.9 mm 1.6 in	36.7 mm 1.4 in	33.9 mm 1.3 in	31.5 mm 1.2 in	26.8 mm 1.0 in	25.8 mm 1.0 in	19.3 mm 0.7 in	341.9 mm 13.2 in
Mean number of rain days	3.9	4.1	4.9	7.1	9.4	10.8	11.9	11.5	9.7	7.7	5.7	4.2	90.9

== Vegetation ==
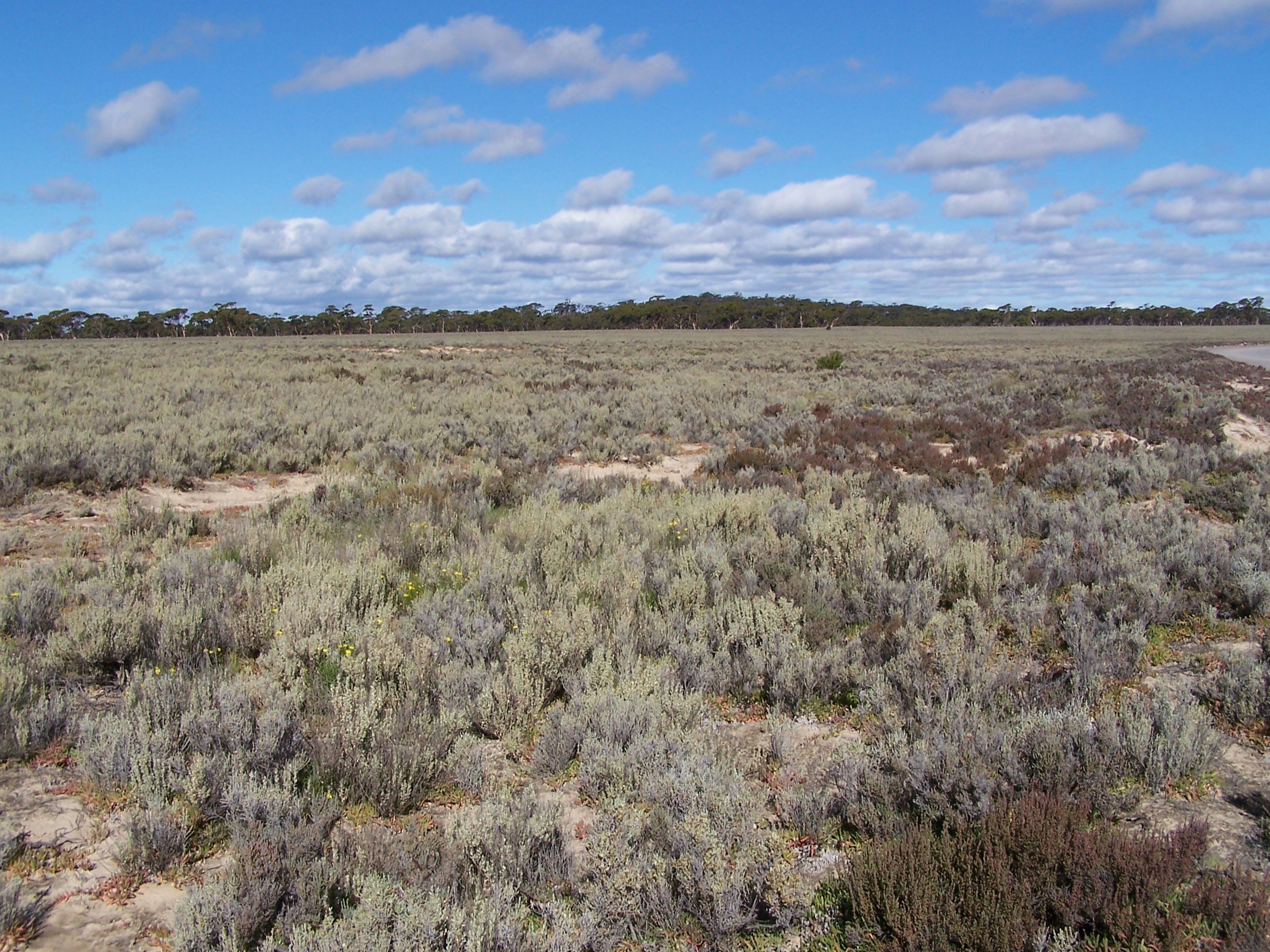
Tecticornia low shrublands bordering Lake Johnston, with Eucalyptus mallee on the horizon

The region's vegetation is predominantly Eucalyptus mallee over myrtaceous and proteaceous heath. Over 50% of the area is vegetated entirely by mallee, and a further 25% is mainly mallee but with patches of woodland; the latter vegetation occurs mainly on the calcareous soils to the east. The mallee consists of numerous Eucalyptus species, the most consistent being E. eremophila (Tall Sand Mallee). Seasonally wet and alluvial areas are vegetated by Melaleuca shrublands where fresh, and Tecticornia low shrublands where saline. There are also occasional thickets of Allocasuarina, especially on greenstone hills.

As of 2007, the Mallee region is known to contain 3443 indigenous vascular plant species, and a further 239 naturalised alien species. As with other regions in semi-arid areas of the South West, it exhibits high endemism, especially with respect to Eucalyptus and Acacia species. The endangered flora of the Mallee region consists of 55 species, with a further 325 species having been declared Priority Flora under the Department of Environment and Conservation's Declared Rare and Priority Flora List.

Species richness ranges from 17 to 48 species per 1000 m^{2}. The lowest species richness occurs in severe habitats such as alongside salt lakes, but also in the areas of highest soil nutrition, where dominant species suppress associated species. Conversely, the highest species richness occurs in soils with the lowest soil nutrition. Most species are killed by fire and regenerate from seed, suggesting that they have evolved in an environment in which fire is infrequent.

Area of Major Vegetation Groups in the Mallee region
Major Vegetation Group	Area before European settlement	Area circa 1997
Cleared / modified native vegetation	-	3,389,464 ha (45.8%)
Mallee woodlands and shrublands	4,208,658 ha (56.9%)	2,152,520 (29.1%)
Eucalyptus open woodlands	1,860,688 ha (25.2%)	896,404 (12.1%)
Eucalypt woodlands	587,132 ha (7.9%)	587,132 (7.9%)
Heath	432,536 ha (5.8%)	196,164 ha (2.7%)
Mangroves, tidal mudflat, samphire and bare areas, claypan, sand, rock, salt lakes, lagoons, lakes	212,504 ha (2.9%)	105,308 ha (1.4%)
Other shrublands	58,628 ha (0.8%)	53,316 ha (0.7%)
Chenopod shrub, samphire shrub and forblands	22,652 ha (0.3%)	5,516 ha (0.1%)
Eucalypt low open forest	6,100 ha (0.1%)	4,492 ha (0.1%)
Low closed forest and closed shrublands	2,912 ha (0.0%)	2,668 ha (0.0%)
Acacia shrublands	1,352 ha (0.0%)	1,348 ha (0.0%)
Other grasslands, herblands, sedgelands and rushlands	820 ha (0.0%)	364 ha (0.0%)
Casuarina forest and woodlands	612 ha (0.0%)	116 ha (0.0%)
Tussock grasslands	28 ha (0.0%)	4 ha (0.0%)
Melaleuca forest and woodlands	12 ha (0.0%)	4 ha (0.0%)

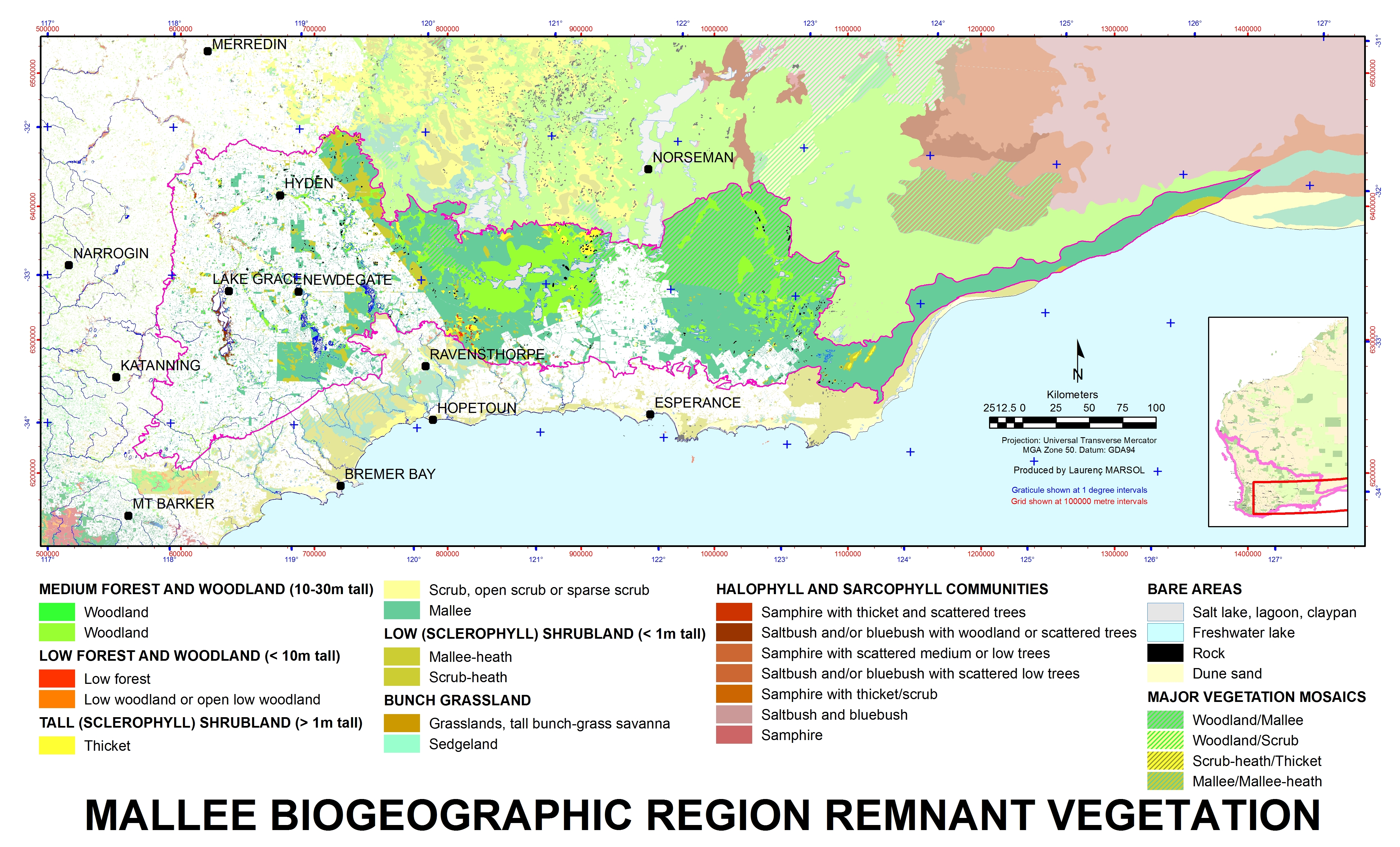
The Mallee biogeographic region, showing physiognomic remnant vegetation type.

== Land use ==
Approximately 56% of the Mallee region falls within what the Department of Agriculture and Food calls the "Intensive Land-use Zone", the area of Western Australia that has been largely cleared and developed for intensive agriculture such as cropping and livestock production. This includes most of the western parts of the region, and a smaller area along the road from Norseman to Esperance. Within this area, only 19.5% of the native vegetation remains uncleared. The remaining 44% of the region falls within the "Extensive Land-use Zone", where the native vegetation has not been cleared but may have been degraded by the grazing of introduced animals and/or changes to the fire regime. Thus about 44.9% of the total Mallee region has been cleared. The majority of clearing was undertaken by the Government of Western Australia between 1958 and 1969, under a program of assisted settlement in which the Government cleared, fenced and stocked virgin crown land, then sold it to aspiring settlers. There has been virtually no further clearing since 1980, when Beard estimated the cleared proportion of the region at 44%.

About 30% of the Esperance Plains region is now in protected areas. It therefore has only medium priority under Australia's National Reserve System.

== Biogeography ==
Early biogeographic regionalisations of Western Australia do not recognise the Mallee region. It cannot be distinguished in Ludwig Diels' 1906 regionalisation of the South West, and is treated as part of the Wheatbelt in Edward de Courcy Clarke's 1926 map. It first appeared in Beard's 1980 phytogeographic regionalisation of Western Australia, but with an eastern limit of Point Culver. Beard named it "Roe Botanical District" in honour of John Septimus Roe, who explored the area in 1848. By 1984, Beard's phytogeographic regions were being presented more generally as "natural regions", and as such were given more widely recognisable names. Thus the "Roe Botanical District" became "Mallee".

When the IBRA was published in the 1990s, Beard's regionalisation was used as the baseline for Western Australia. The Mallee region was accepted as defined by Beard, and has since survived a number of revisions. The only significant change to its boundary is the extension of its eastern boundary eastwards along the coast as far as Eyre. The most recent revision, Version 6.1, defines two sub-regions for the Mallee region, Western Mallee and Eastern Mallee.

Under the World Wildlife Fund's biogeographic regionalisation of the Earth's land into "ecoregions", Mallee is combined with Esperance Plains to form the Esperance mallee ecoregion.
