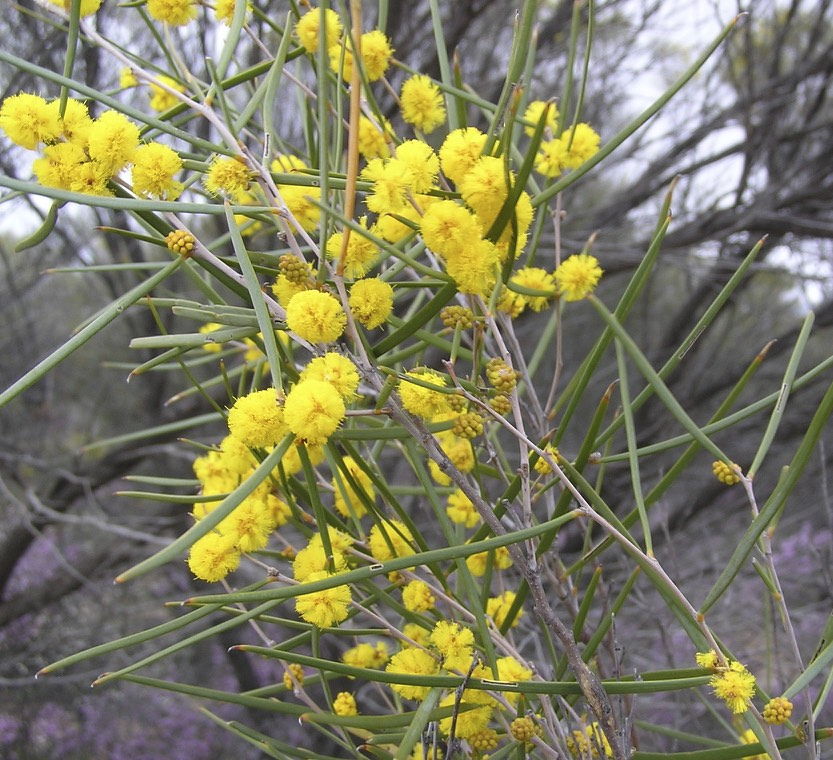
- Acacia enervia subsp. explicata

Scientific classification
- Kingdom: Plantae
- Clade: Tracheophytes
- Clade: Angiosperms
- Clade: Eudicots
- Clade: Rosids
- Order: Fabales
- Family: Fabaceae
- Subfamily: Caesalpinioideae
- Clade: Mimosoid clade
- Genus: Acacia
- Species: A. enervia

Binomial name
- Acacia enervia Maiden & Blakely
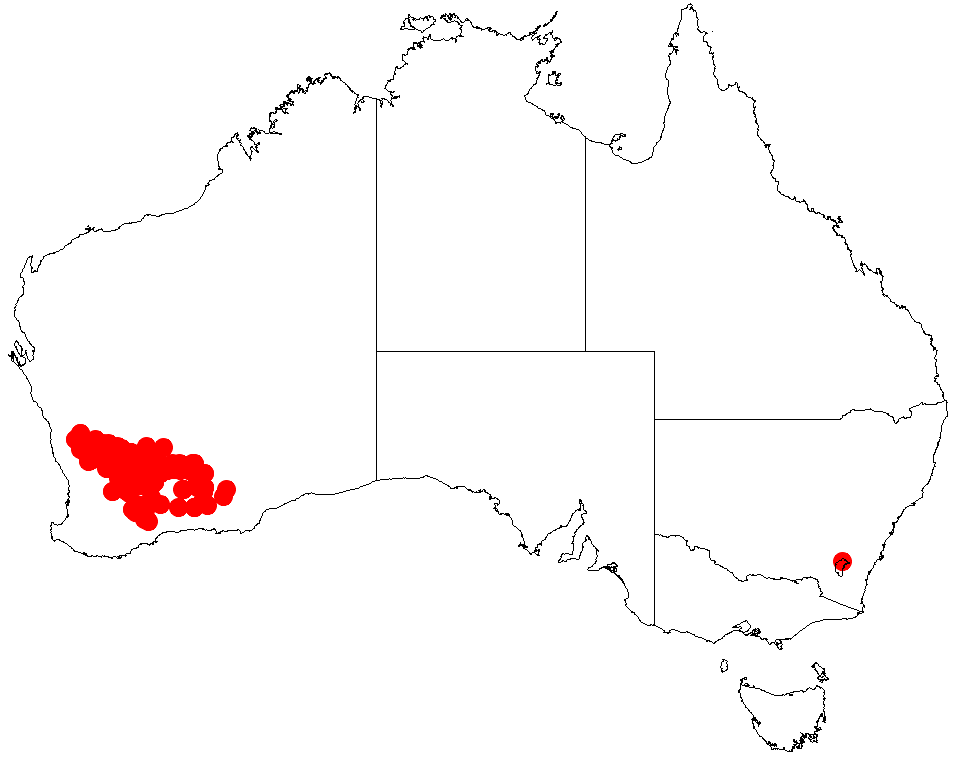
- Occurrence data from AVH

Synonyms
- Racosperma enervium (Maiden & Blakely) Pedley

= Acacia enervia =

Species of legume

Acacia enervia is a species of flowering plant in the family Fabaceae and is endemic to the south-west of Western Australia. It is a dense, rounded or conical shrub with slightly angular branchlets, flat, linear to narrowly lance-shaped or terete phyllodes, spherical heads of golden yellow flowers, and linear, thinly leathery pods more or less constricted between the seeds.

== Description ==
Acacia enervia is a dense, rounded or conical shrub with the narrower end towards the base, rarely a small tree, that typically grows to a height of 0.6–4 m (2 ft 0 in – 13 ft 1 in). Its branchlets are slightly angular, glabrous or with soft hairs pressed against the surface. Its phyllodes are inclined to erect, flat and linear to narrowly lance-shaped with the narrower end towards the base, or more or less terete, 20–856 mm (0.79–33.70 in) long and 0.8–6 mm (0.031–0.236 in) wide. The flowers are borne in up to three spherical heads in leaf axils on peduncles 2–9 mm (0.079–0.354 in) long. Each head is 3–5 mm (0.12–0.20 in) in diameter with 18 to 33 golden yellow flowers. Flowering time depends on subspecies, and the pods are linear, straight or slightly curved, up to 85 mm (3.3 in) long, 2.0–2.5 mm (0.079–0.098 in) long, thinly leathery, glabrous and more or less constricted between the seeds. The seeds are narrowly elliptic to oblong, 3–4 mm (0.12–0.16 in) long and black with a white aril on the end.

== Taxonomy ==
Acacia enervia was first formally described in 1927 by Joseph Maiden and William Blakely in the Journal of the Royal Society of Western Australia from a specimen collected by Max Koch on Hines Hill in 1923.

This species of wattle is most closely related to A. lineolata and A. inceana that belong to the Acacia enervia group of wattles.

In 1995, Richard Sumner Cowan and Bruce Maslin described two subspecies of A. enervia in the journal Nuytsia, and the names are accepted by the Australian Plant Census:

- Acacia enervia subsp. enervia has more or less terete phyllodes, the flower heads 3–4 mm (0.12–0.16 in) in diameter and flowers mainly in September and October.
- Acacia enervia subsp. explicata R.S.Cowan & Maslin has flat, linear to narrowly lance-shaped phyllodes, the flower heads 4–5 mm (0.16–0.20 in) in diameter and flowers from August to October.

== Distribution and habitat ==
This species of wattle is wide-ranging in the south-west of Western Australia, from north of Dalwallinu to near Lake Grace and Lake Magenta and east to Clear Streak Well, about 70 km (43 mi) east-south-east of Norseman.

- Subspecies enervia grows in sand, sandy loam or loam, usually in open woodland or open scrub mallee, in the Avon Wheatbelt, Coolgardie and Mallee bioregions.
- Subspecies explicata grows mostly in saline situations around salt marshes, flats and lakes, sometimes in rocky clay on hills, in the Avon Wheatbelt, Coolgardie, Geraldton Sandplains and Mallee bioregions.

== See also ==
- List of Acacia species
