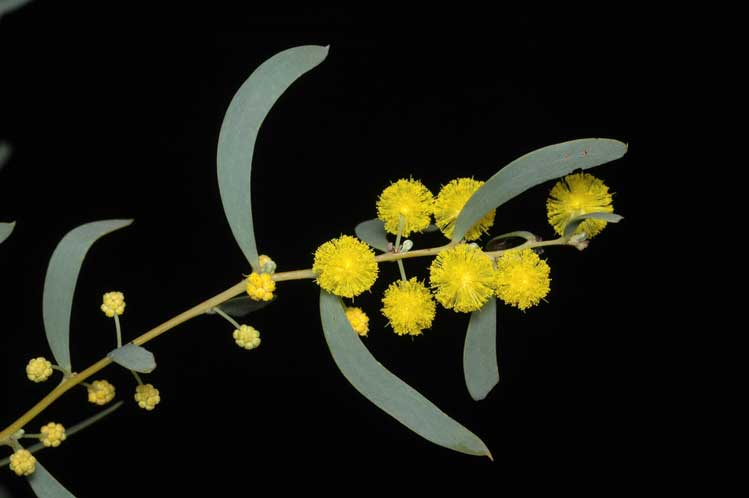
- In the Australian National Botanic Gardens

Scientific classification
- Kingdom: Plantae
- Clade: Embryophytes
- Clade: Tracheophytes
- Clade: Spermatophytes
- Clade: Angiosperms
- Clade: Eudicots
- Clade: Rosids
- Order: Fabales
- Family: Fabaceae
- Subfamily: Caesalpinioideae
- Clade: Mimosoid clade
- Genus: Acacia
- Species: A. patagiata

Binomial name
- Acacia patagiata R.S.Cowan & Maslin
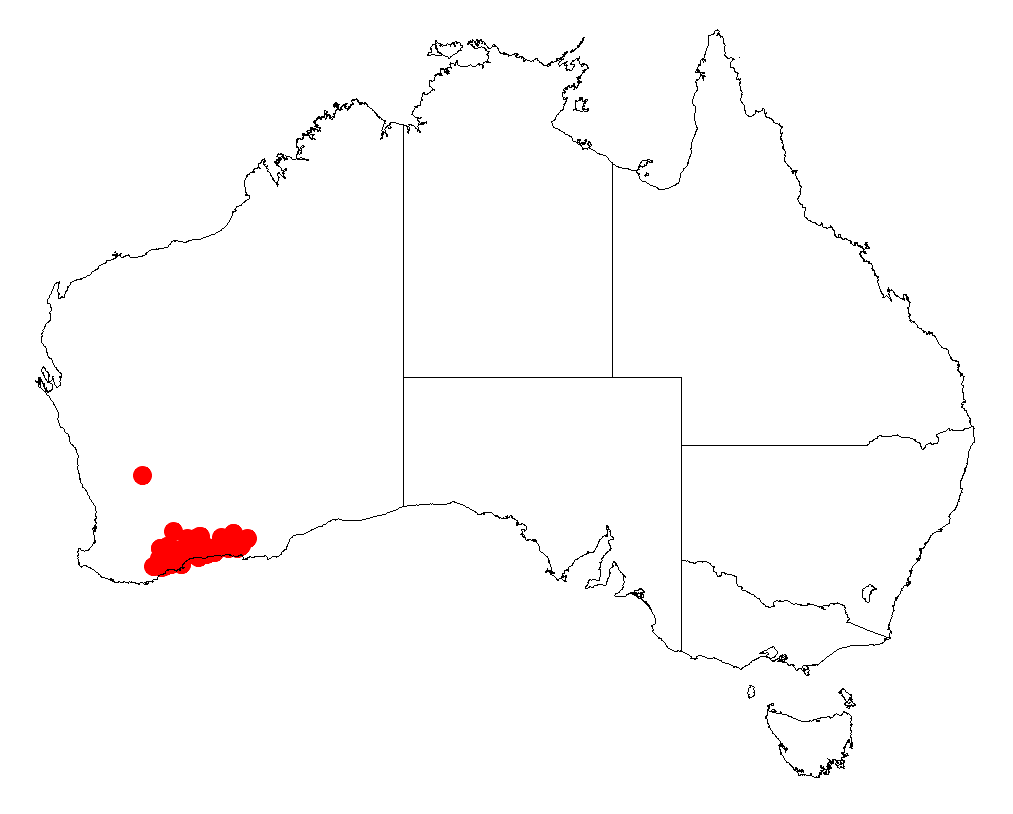
- Occurrence data from AVH

= Acacia patagiata =

Salt gully wattle

Species of legume

Acacia patagiata, also commonly knowns as salt gully wattle, is a shrub of the genus Acacia and the subgenus Plurinerves that is endemic to south western Australia.

== Description ==
The rounded shrub typically grows to a height of 0.5 to 2.5 metres (2 to 8 ft) and has glarous to very lightly haired branchlets. Like most species of Acacia it has phyllodes rather that true leaves. The rigid, leathery, glabrous and pungent grey-green phyllodes are ascending to erect and have an oblong-oblanceolate to elliptic shape and are slightly to shallowly to strongly incurved. The phyllodes are around 2.5 to 5.5 cm (0.98 to 2.17 in) in length and 3 to 8 mm (0.12 to 0.31 in) wide and have many fine, parallel veins with the central nerve more prominent than the others. It blooms from July to September and produces yellow flowers.

== Taxonomy ==
The species was first formally described by the botanists Richard Sumner Cowan and Bruce Maslin in 1990 as a part of the work Acacia Miscellany 3. Some new microneurous taxa of Western Australia related to A. multineata (Leguminosae: Mimosoideae: Section Plurinerves) from Western Australia as published in the journal Nuytsia. It is very similar in appearance to Acacia lineolata subsp. multilineata and also Acacia unguicula to a lesser degree. It also resembles Acacia mimica.

== Distribution ==
It is native to an area in the Wheatbelt, Great Southern and Goldfields-Esperance regions of Western Australia where it is commonly situated along salt rivers and creeks and along the margins of salt lakes and salt pans growing in sandy, sandy-loam or clay soils. The range of the plant extends from around Pingrup in the north west to around Mount Ney in the east.

== See also ==
- List of Acacia species
