= Acacia undosa =

Conservation status
- Priority Three — Poorly Known Taxa (DEC)

Scientific classification
- Kingdom: Plantae
- Clade: Tracheophytes
- Clade: Angiosperms
- Clade: Eudicots
- Clade: Rosids
- Order: Fabales
- Family: Fabaceae
- Subfamily: Caesalpinioideae
- Clade: Mimosoid clade
- Genus: Acacia
- Species: A. undosa

Binomial name
- Acacia undosa R.S.Cowan & Maslin
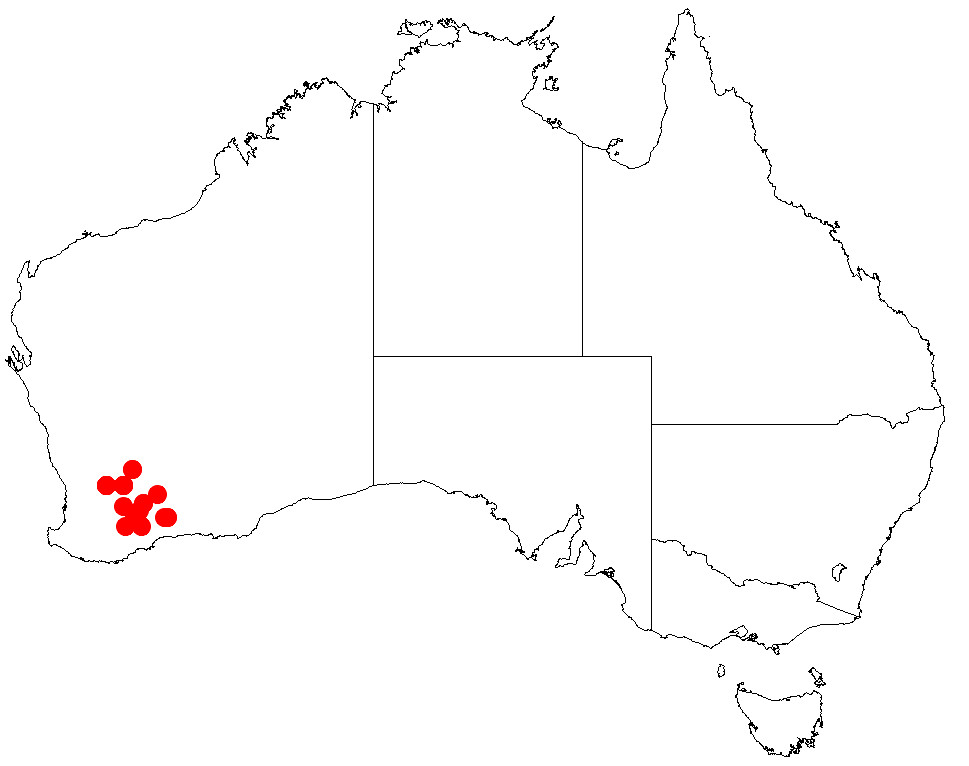
- Occurrence data from AVH

Species of legume

Acacia undosa is a shrub of the genus Acacia and the subgenus Plurinerves that is endemic to an area of south western Australia.

== Description ==
The dense spreading shrub typically grows to a height of 0.3 to 1.5 metres (1 to 5 ft) and has a domed or obconic habit with hairy branchlets with persistent slender stipules that taper to a point and have a length of about 2 mm (0.079 in). Like most species of Acacia it has phyllodes rather than true leaves. The rigid, glabrous and pungent phyllodes have a linear to linear-oblanceolate shape and are straight to slightly curved with a length of 2 to 4.5 cm (0.79 to 1.77 in) and a width of 1 to 4 mm (0.039 to 0.157 in) and terminate with a rigid point. It blooms from July to September and produces yellow flowers. The simple inflorescences occur in pairs in the axils and have spherical flower-heads with a diameter of 3 to 3.5 mm (0.12 to 0.14 in) containing 18 to 20 golden coloured flowers. The pimply looking and crustaceous seed pods form that have a linear shape but are strongly undulate with a length of 1 to 4 cm (0.39 to 1.57 in) and a width of 2.5 mm (0.098 in) with a distinct pale marginal nerve. The dark brown seeds inside the pods have an elliptic-oblong to broadly oblong-elliptic shape with a length of 2.2 to 2.7 mm (0.087 to 0.106 in).

== Taxonomy ==
The species was first formally described by the botanists Richard Sumner Cowan and Bruce Maslin in 1995 as a part of the work Acacia Miscellany. Five groups of microneurous species of Acacia (Leguminosae: Mimosoideae: section Plurinerves), mostly from Western Australia as published in the journal Nuytsia. It was reclassified as Racosperma undosum by Leslie Pedley in 2003 then transferred back to genus Acacia in 2006.

== Distribution ==
It is native to an area in the Wheatbelt region of Western Australia where it is commonly situated in low-lying areas or on undulating plains growing in sandy clay or sandy-loamy soils. The range of the plant extends from around Bruce Rock and Tammin in the north down to near Lake Grace in the south west and Lake King in the south east where it is often a part of open shrub mallee communities.

== See also ==
- List of Acacia species
