= Acacia singula =

Conservation status
- Priority Three — Poorly Known Taxa (DEC)

Scientific classification
- Kingdom: Plantae
- Clade: Tracheophytes
- Clade: Angiosperms
- Clade: Eudicots
- Clade: Rosids
- Order: Fabales
- Family: Fabaceae
- Subfamily: Caesalpinioideae
- Clade: Mimosoid clade
- Genus: Acacia
- Species: A. singula

Binomial name
- Acacia singula Maslin & R.S.Cowan
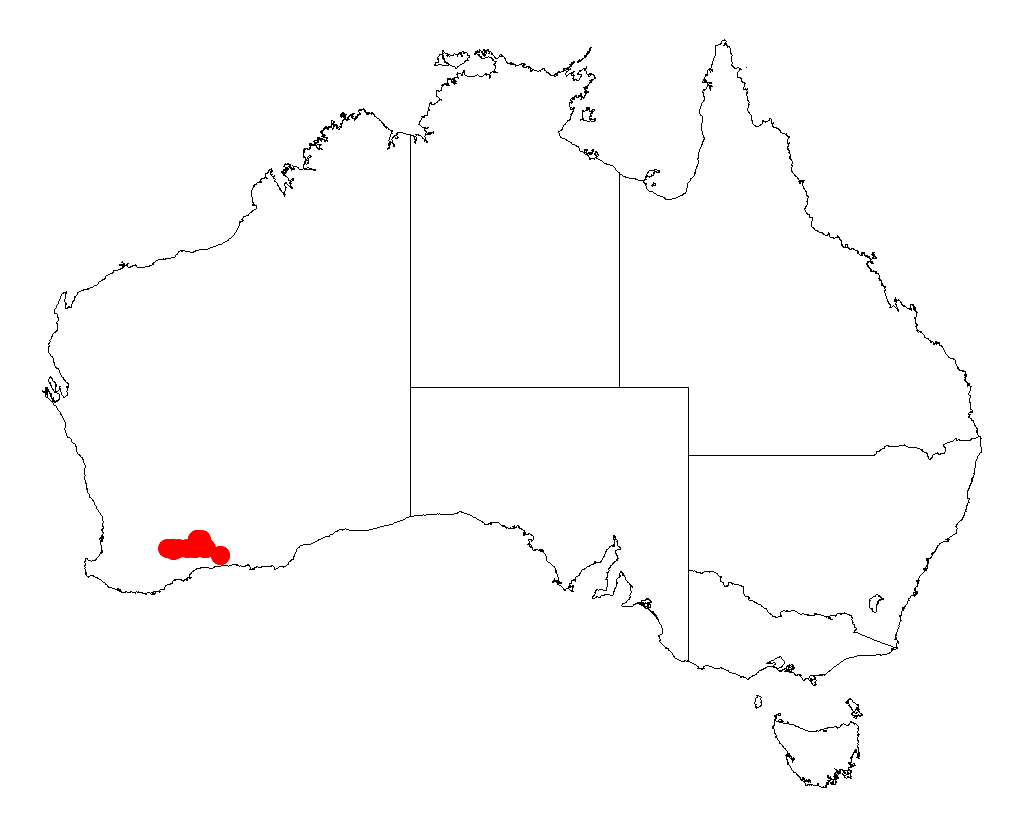
- Occurrence data from AVH

Species of legume

Acacia singula is a shrub belonging to the genus Acacia and the subgenus Juliflorae that is endemic to western Australia

The shrub typically grows to a height of 0.35 to 2 metres (1 to 7 ft). It blooms from August to October producing yellow flowers.

It is native to an area in the Goldfields-Esperance and Wheatbelt regions of Western Australia where it is often situated on hilltops and rises growing in sandy or gravelly soils often over or around laterite.

== See also ==
- List of Acacia species
