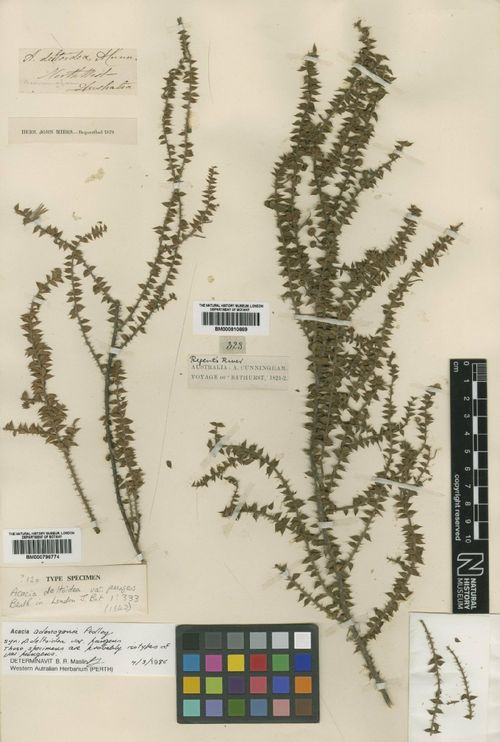
- Holotype in the Natural History Museum, London

Scientific classification
- Kingdom: Plantae
- Clade: Tracheophytes
- Clade: Angiosperms
- Clade: Eudicots
- Clade: Rosids
- Order: Fabales
- Family: Fabaceae
- Subfamily: Caesalpinioideae
- Clade: Mimosoid clade
- Genus: Acacia
- Species: A. adenogonia

Binomial name
- Acacia adenogonia (Pedley) R.S.Cowan & Maslin
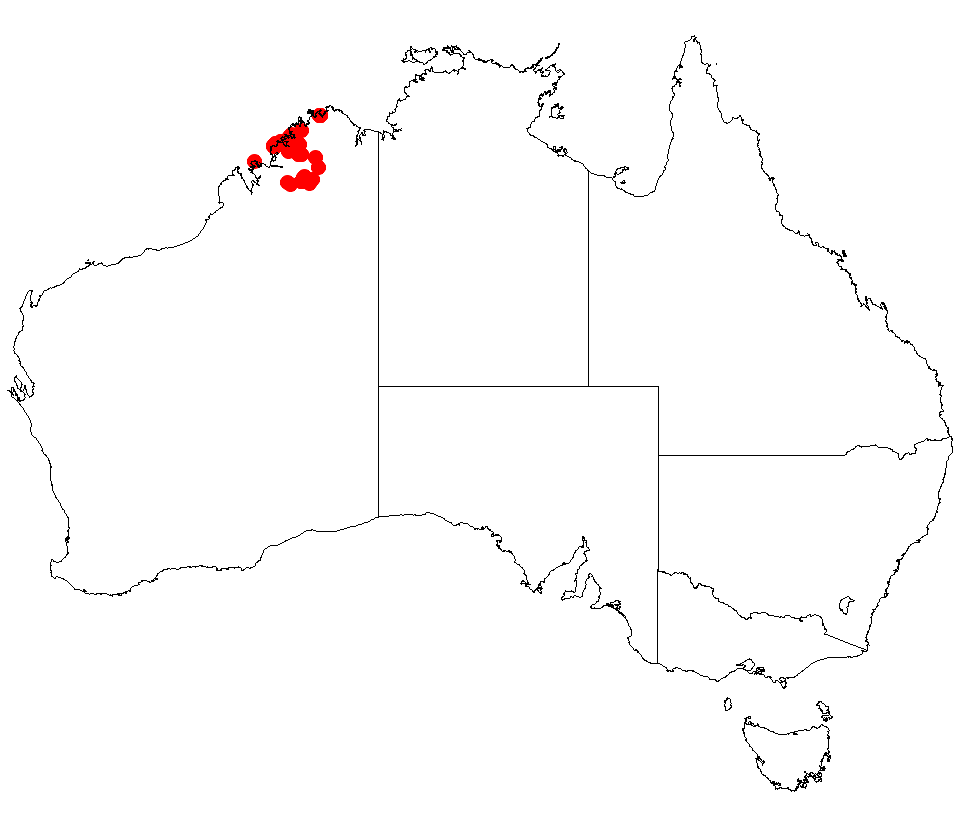
- Occurrence data from AVH

Synonyms
- Acacia deltoidea var. pungens Benth.; Acacia deltoiden var. pungens Benth. orth. var.; Racosperma adenogonium Pedley

= Acacia adenogonia =

Species of legume

Acacia adenogonia is a species of flowering plant in the family Fabaceae and is endemic to northern Western Australia. It is a prickly, erect to sprawling shrub with cylindrical branchlets, egg-shaped to lance-shaped phyllodes, flowers arranged in spherical heads of golden yellow flowers, and thin leathery pods that are constricted between the seeds.

== Description ==
Acacia adenogonia is a prickly, erect to sprawling shrub that typically grows to a height of 1–2.5 m (3 ft 3 in – 8 ft 2 in) and has branchlets usually covered with white or greyish, downy hairs. Its phyllodes are more or less sessile, egg-shaped to lance-shaped, mostly 5–10 mm (0.20–0.39 in) long and 1.5–4.5 mm (0.059–0.177 in) wide, leathery and sharply pointed. There are tapering stipules up to 6.5 mm (0.26 in) long at the base of the phyllodes. The flowers are arranged in a spherical head 4–6 mm (0.16–0.24 in) in diameter, on a peduncle 7.5–14 mm (0.30–0.55 in) long. The head contains 60 to 92 golden-yellow flowers. Flowering has been observed in January, February and from May to September and the pod is thinly leathery, linear, 85 mm (3.3 in) long and 5–6.5 mm (0.20–0.26 in) wide, and constricted between the seeds. The seeds are elliptic, 6.0–6.5 mm (0.24–0.26 in) long and dull brownish-black with an aril on the end.

== Taxonomy ==
This species was first formally described in 1987 by Leslie Pedley who gave it the name Racosperma adenogonium in the journal Austrobaileya. In 1990, Richard Sumner Cowan and Bruce Maslin transferred the species to Acacia as A. adenogonia in the journal Nuytsia. The specific epithet (adenogonia) means "gland-angled".

== Distribution ==
Acacia adenogonia is native to an area in the Kimberley region of Western Australia. The shrub has a scattered distribution with separate populations found through the West Kimberley particularly along the Bonaparte Archipelago, the Broome and Napier Bay areas, and inland as far as Phillips Range, Kimberley Downs Station and Beverley Springs Station, and is found on areas of sandstone growing in sandy soils as a part of woodland communities.

== See also ==
- List of Acacia species
