= Acacia speckii =

Conservation status
- Priority Four — Rare Taxa (DEC)

Scientific classification
- Kingdom: Plantae
- Clade: Tracheophytes
- Clade: Angiosperms
- Clade: Eudicots
- Clade: Rosids
- Order: Fabales
- Family: Fabaceae
- Subfamily: Caesalpinioideae
- Clade: Mimosoid clade
- Genus: Acacia
- Species: A. speckii

Binomial name
- Acacia speckii R.S.Cowan & Maslin
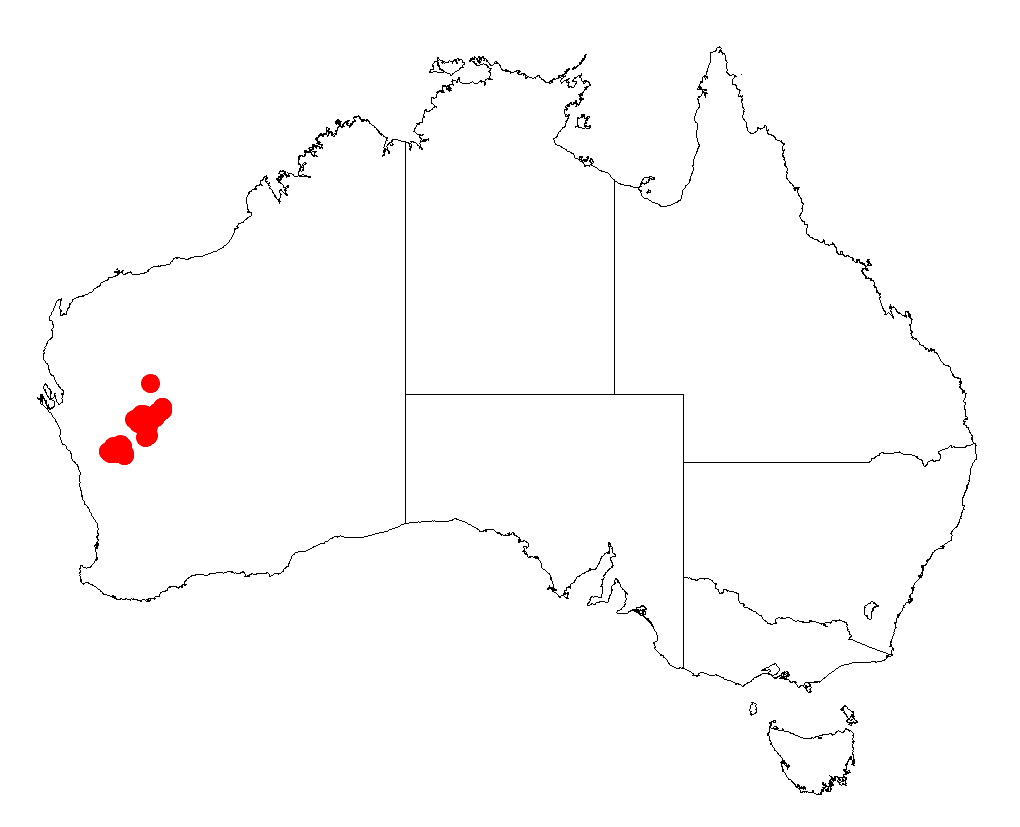
- Occurrence data from AVH

Species of legume

Acacia speckii is a shrub or tree of the genus Acacia and the subgenus Plurinerves that is endemic to a small area in central western Australia.

== Description ==
The bushy rounded shrub or tree typically grows to a height of 1.5 to 3 metres (5 to 10 ft) and has glabrous, cylindrical grey coloured branchlets. Like most species of Acacia it has phyllodes rather than true leaves. The erect and evergreen phyllodes have a threadlike shape and are straight to shallowly incurved and usually bent at the gland. The rigid, glabrous, grey-green phyllodes usually have a length of 8 to 12 cm (3.1 to 4.7 in) and a diameter of 1 to 1.5 mm (0.039 to 0.059 in) and have eight distant, strongly raised nerves. When it blooms it produces simple inflorescences that occur singly or in pairs in the axils with broadly ellipsoid to obloid shaped flower-heads. The glabrous, chartaceous and light brown seed pods that form after flowering resemble a string of beads and have a length up to around 13.5 cm (5.3 in) and a width of 4 to 6 mm (0.16 to 0.24 in) containing spherical dull brown seeds.

== Taxonomy ==
The species was first formally described in 1999 by the botanists Richard Sumner Cowan and Bruce Maslin in 1999 as a part of the work The taxonomy of miscellaneous species with sharply pungent phyllodes in Acacia section Plurinerves (Leguminosae: Mimosoideae) as published in the journal Nuytsia. In 2003 it was reclassified by Leslie Pedley as Racosperma speckii then transferred back to genus Acacia in 2006.

== Distribution ==
It is native to an area in the Mid West and Goldfields-Esperance regions of Western Australia where it is commonly situated on rocky rises or hills growing in rocky soils over or around granite, dolerite or basalt. The range of the plant extends from around Meektharra in the north down to around Cue in the south with disjunct populations found further south near Yalgoo where it is usually a part of mulga scrub communities.

== See also ==
- List of Acacia species
