= Acacia mimica =

Scientific classification
- Kingdom: Plantae
- Clade: Tracheophytes
- Clade: Angiosperms
- Clade: Eudicots
- Clade: Rosids
- Order: Fabales
- Family: Fabaceae
- Subfamily: Caesalpinioideae
- Clade: Mimosoid clade
- Genus: Acacia
- Species: A. mimica

Binomial name
- Acacia mimica R.S.Cowan & Maslin
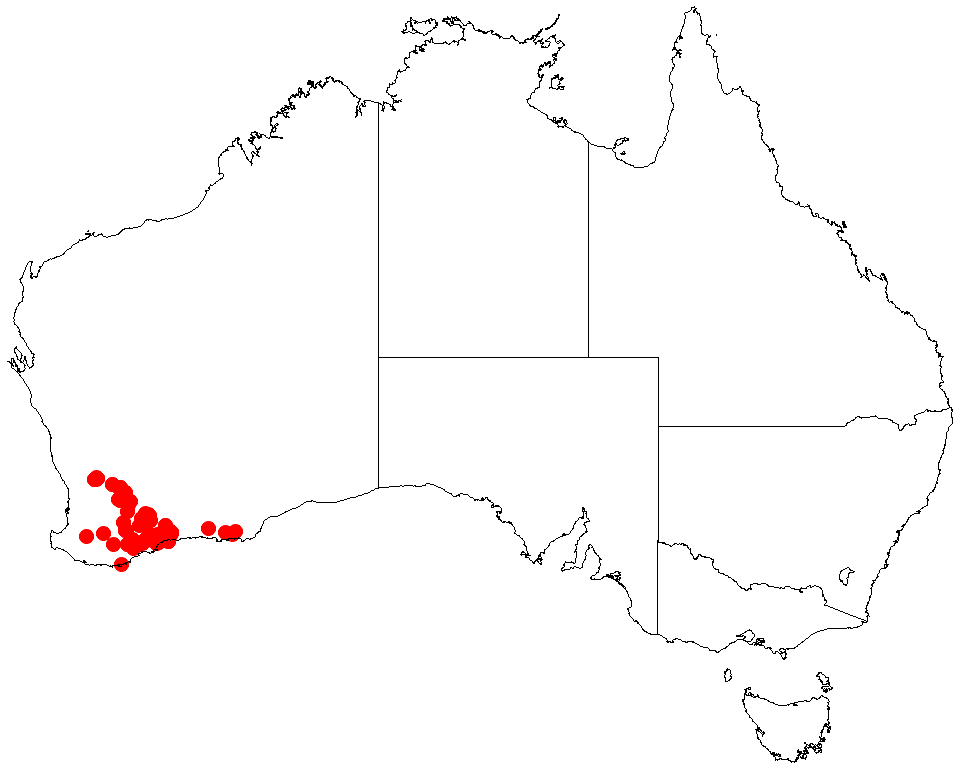
- Occurrence data from AVH

Synonyms
- Racosperma mimicum (R.S.Cowan & Maslin) Pedley

Species of legume

Acacia mimica is a species of flowering plant in the family Fabaceae, and is endemic to the south-west of Western Australia. It is a dense, erect or semi-prostrate shrub with narrowly elliptic, lance-shaped to linear phyllodes, more or less spherical heads of golden yellow flowers, and linear, crusty pods raised over and more or less constricted between the seeds.

== Description ==
Acacia mimica is a dense, erect or semi-prostrate shrub that typically grows to a height of 0.3–2.5 m (1–8 ft) and has hairy or glabrous branchlets. Its phyllodes are narrowly elliptic to lance-shaped with the narrower end towards the base, or linear, more or less curved, 18–105 mm (0.71–4.13 in) long, 2–7 mm (0.079–0.276 in) wide, leathery, glaucous and mostly glabrous with many raised, closely parallel veins and prominent yellow marginal veins. The flowers are borne in sessile, more or less spherical heads. The heads are 4–7 mm (0.16–0.28 in) in diameter, with 15 to 25 golden yellow flowers. Flowering time depends on variety, and the pods are suberect, linear, straight to weakly curved, 25–75 mm (0.98–2.95 in) long and 2–4 mm (0.079–0.157 in) wide, crusty and glabrous. The seeds are oval to elliptic or oblong, 2–3.5 mm (0.079–0.138 in) long, glossy and mottled with the aril in two loose loops over the end of the seed.

== Taxonomy ==
Acacia mimica was first formally described by Richard Cowan and Bruce Maslin in the journal Nuytsia from specimens collected by Maslin, 11.2 km (7.0 mi) south-west of Dowerin towards Goomalling in 1971. The specific epithet (mimica) means 'mimicking' or 'imitative', referring to the similarity of phyllode morphology of this species to A. patagiata.

In the same journal, Cowan and Maslin described two varieties of Acacia mimica, and the names are accepted by the Australian Plant Census:

- Acacia mimica var. angusta R.S.Cowan & Maslin has phyllodes mostly 40–80 mm (1.6–3.1 in) long, 12 to 45 times longer than wide, flowers from July to October, and has seeds mostly dark tan on pale grey-brown.
- Acacia mimica R.S.Cowan & Maslin var. mimica has phyllodes mostly 20–30 mm (0.79–1.18 in) long, 3 to 8 times longer than wide, flowers from August to September, and has seeds mostly light grey-brown on dark tan.

== Distribution and habitat ==
Acacia mimica is a wide-ranging species from near Goomalling south-south-east to near Borden and east to near Ravensthorpe with outliers near Scaddan and Mount Burdett about 120 km (75 mi) east of Ravensthorpe. Variety angusta often grows on clay, sandy clay or gravelly clay in low scrub-mallee, and is confined to, but locally common, in the Borden-Ravensthorpe area, apart from two collections near Scaddan and Mount Burdett, in the Esperance Plains and Mallee bioregions. Variety mimica grows in sand or sandy gravel on hillsides and sandplains in scattered locations from near Goomalling and south-south-east to near Jerramungup in the Avon Wheatbelt, Esperance Plains, Jarrah Forest and Mallee bioregions of south-western Western Australia.

== Conservation status ==
Both varieties of A. mimica are listed as 'not threatened' by the Government of Western Australia Department of Biodiversity, Conservation and Attractions.

== See also ==
- List of Acacia species
