= Acacia hadrophylla =

Scientific classification
- Kingdom: Plantae
- Clade: Tracheophytes
- Clade: Angiosperms
- Clade: Eudicots
- Clade: Rosids
- Order: Fabales
- Family: Fabaceae
- Subfamily: Caesalpinioideae
- Clade: Mimosoid clade
- Genus: Acacia
- Species: A. hadrophylla

Binomial name
- Acacia hadrophylla R.S.Cowan & Maslin
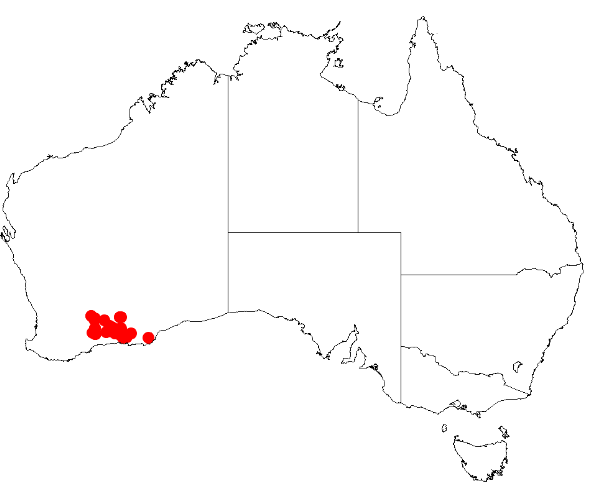
- Occurrence data from AVH

Synonyms
- Racosperma hadrophyllum (R.S.Cowan & Maslin) Pedley

Species of legume

Habit near Lake King

Acacia hadrophylla is a species of flowering plant in the family Fabaceae and is endemic to the south-west of Western Australia. It is a shrub with curved, oblong phyllodes, spherical heads of golden yellow flowers and linear, crusty pods, more or less constricted between the seeds.

== Description ==
Acacia hadrophylla is a domed to inverted conical, dense to moderately open shrub that typically grows to a height of 30–50 cm (12–20 in), and has branchlets covered with tiny black hairs. Its phyllodes are oblong to elliptic, 7–25 mm (0.28–0.98 in) long, 2.5–5.5 mm (0.098–0.217 in) wide and rigid with a small point on the end and five to seven prominent, yellowish veins. The flowers are borne in two spherical heads in axils, each head 3.0–3.5 mm (0.12–0.14 in) in diameter with 14 to 25 golden yellow flowers. Flowering occurs from June to September and the pods are linear, crusty, more or less curved, 12–22 mm (0.47–0.87 in) long and 2 mm (0.079 in) wide. The seeds are oblong to elliptic, 2.5–3.0 mm (0.098–0.118 in) long and brownish black with an aril on the end.

== Taxonomy ==
Acacia hadrophylla was first formally described in 1995 by Richard Sumner Cowan and Bruce Maslin in the journal Nuytsia from specimens collected by Maslin between the Bremer Range and the Lake King-Kumarl road in 1983. The specific epithet (hadrophylla) means 'thick, bulky or stout leaves', referring to the thick phyllodes of this species.

== Distribution and habitat ==
This species of wattle occurs in scattered locations from Mount Holland (about 85 km (53 mi) north-east of Hyden and Lake King, and east to Kumarl and Scaddan (between Norseman and Esperance), in the Avon Wheatbelt, Coolgardie and Mallee bioregions, where it grows on undulating plains in sandy, loamy and clay loam soils.

== Conservation status ==
Acacia gregorii is listed as "not threatened" by the Government of Western Australia Department of Biodiversity, Conservation and Attractions.

== See also ==
- List of Acacia species
