= Swartzia macrosema =

Conservation status
- Least Concern (IUCN 3.1)

Scientific classification
- Kingdom: Plantae
- Clade: Tracheophytes
- Clade: Angiosperms
- Clade: Eudicots
- Clade: Rosids
- Order: Fabales
- Family: Fabaceae
- Subfamily: Faboideae
- Genus: Swartzia
- Species: S. macrosema

Binomial name
- Swartzia macrosema Harms

Synonyms
- Swartzia aureosericea R. S. Cowan

Species of legume

Swartzia macrosema is a species of flowering plant in the family Fabaceae. It is found only in Ecuador. Its natural habitat is subtropical or tropical moist montane forests.
