= Acacia truculenta =

Scientific classification
- Kingdom: Plantae
- Clade: Tracheophytes
- Clade: Angiosperms
- Clade: Eudicots
- Clade: Rosids
- Order: Fabales
- Family: Fabaceae
- Subfamily: Caesalpinioideae
- Clade: Mimosoid clade
- Genus: Acacia
- Species: A. truculenta

Binomial name
- Acacia truculenta Maslin

Species of legume

Acacia truculenta is a shrub of the genus Acacia and the subgenus Phyllodineae. It is native to a small area in the Goldfields-Esperance region of Western Australia.

The spreading prickly shrub typically grows to a height of 0.7 to 2.2 metres (2 to 7 ft). It blooms from August to September and produces yellow flowers.

== See also ==
- List of Acacia species
