= Acacia parkerae =

Conservation status
- Priority Three — Poorly Known Taxa (DEC)

Scientific classification
- Kingdom: Plantae
- Clade: Tracheophytes
- Clade: Angiosperms
- Clade: Eudicots
- Clade: Rosids
- Order: Fabales
- Family: Fabaceae
- Subfamily: Caesalpinioideae
- Clade: Mimosoid clade
- Genus: Acacia
- Species: A. parkerae

Binomial name
- Acacia parkerae Maslin

Species of legume

Acacia parkerae, also known as Parker's wattle, is a shrub of the genus Acacia that is native to the south western parts of Western Australia.

== See also ==
- List of Acacia species
