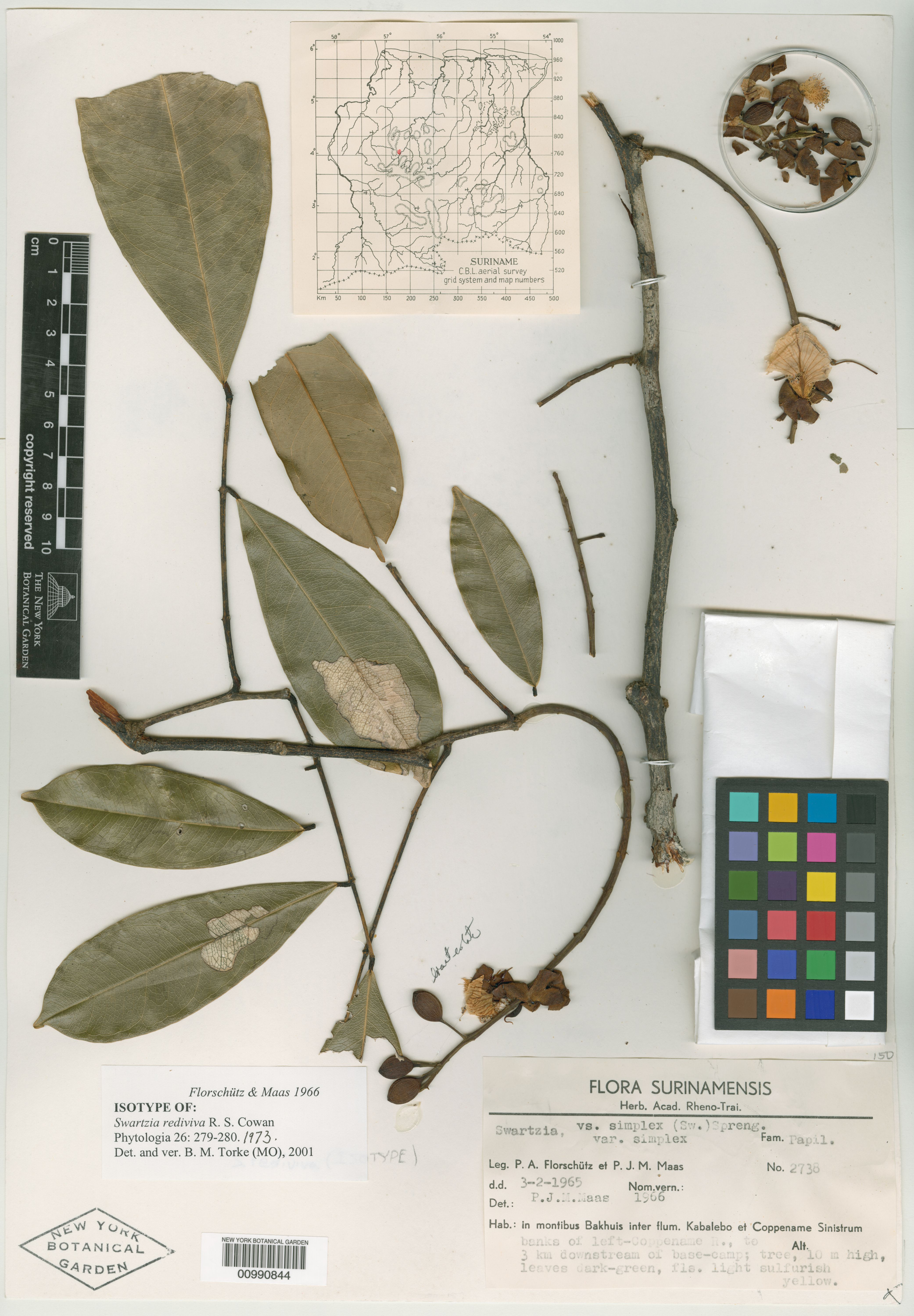
- Preserved specimen at The New York Botanical Garden

Conservation status
- Critically Endangered (IUCN 3.1)

Scientific classification
- Kingdom: Plantae
- Clade: Tracheophytes
- Clade: Angiosperms
- Clade: Eudicots
- Clade: Rosids
- Order: Fabales
- Family: Fabaceae
- Subfamily: Faboideae
- Genus: Swartzia
- Species: S. rediviva

Binomial name
- Swartzia rediviva R.S.Cowan

= Swartzia rediviva =

Species of legume

Swartzia rediviva is a species of flowering plant in the family Fabaceae. It is found only in Suriname.

== Description ==
It was first described by Richard Sumner Cowan in 1973. The first description is based on a specimen collected near the banks of the left Coppename River. Publication of this description was accelerated ahead of a set of the publication other taxa descriptions, to facilitate its inclusion into the imminent release of the book Flora of Suriname.

== Range ==
This species is said to be only found in Suriname. GBIF, which is an aggregation service of observational data on species, has no observations so far.
