= Swartzia santanderensis =

Conservation status
- Near Threatened (IUCN 3.1)

Scientific classification
- Kingdom: Plantae
- Clade: Tracheophytes
- Clade: Angiosperms
- Clade: Eudicots
- Clade: Rosids
- Order: Fabales
- Family: Fabaceae
- Subfamily: Faboideae
- Genus: Swartzia
- Species: S. santanderensis

Binomial name
- Swartzia santanderensis R.S.Cowan

Species of legume

Swartzia santanderensis is a species of flowering plant in the family Fabaceae. It is found only in Colombia.
