= Acacia inceana =

Scientific classification
- Kingdom: Plantae
- Clade: Tracheophytes
- Clade: Angiosperms
- Clade: Eudicots
- Clade: Rosids
- Order: Fabales
- Family: Fabaceae
- Subfamily: Caesalpinioideae
- Clade: Mimosoid clade
- Genus: Acacia
- Species: A. inceana

Binomial name
- Acacia inceana Domin
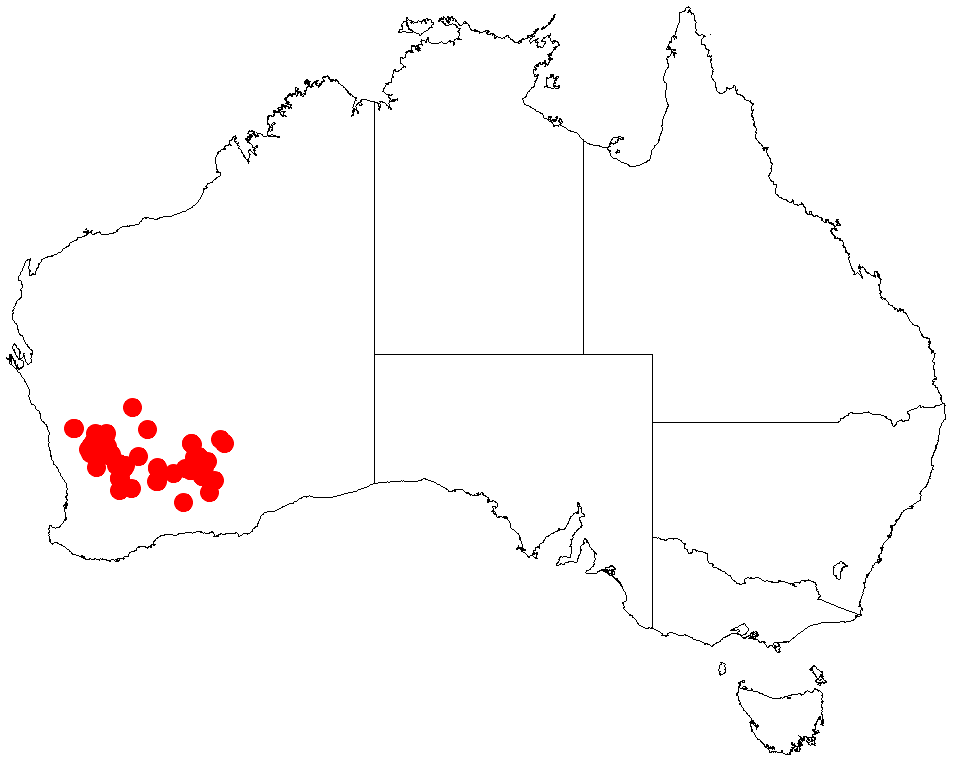
- Occurrence data from AVH

Synonyms
- Acacia inceae Maiden & Blakely orth. var.; Racosperma inceanum (Domin) Pedley

Species of legume

Habit in the Jibberding Nature Reserve, near Wubin

Acacia inceana is a species of flowering plant in the family Fabaceae and is endemic to mostly inland areas of Western Australia. It is a shrub or tree with mostly glabrous branchlets, straight or slightly curved, terete to flat phyllodes, one or two spherical heads of yellow flowers, and linear, firmly papery to thinly leathery pods.

== Description ==
Acacia inceana is shrub or tree that typically grows to a height of 1–4 m (3–13 ft) and has terete, mostly glabrous branchlets or covered with fine downy hairs at first. Its phyllodes are straight or slightly curved, terete to flat, 40–85 mm (1.6–3.3 in) long and 1.0–1.5 mm (0.039–0.059 in) in diameter and about 4 mm (0.16 in) wide when flattened. The end of the phyllode is narrowed to a more or less rigid tip with one or two glands 4–15 mm (0.16–0.59 in) above the pulvinus. The flowers are borne in one or two spherical heads in axils on a peduncle 3–6 mm (0.12–0.24 in) long, each head 3.5–4.0 mm (0.14–0.16 in) in diameter, with 10 to 30 yellow flowers. Flowering occurs in August and September, an the pods are linear, slightly raised over but not constricted between the seeds, 40–100 mm (1.6–3.9 in) long and 3–4 mm (0.12–0.16 in) wide firmly papery to thinly leathery, tan, light- or pale-dull brown and glabrous. The seeds are oblong, 4–6 mm (0.16–0.24 in) long, subglossy dark brown with a white aril on the end.

== Taxonomy ==
Acacia inceana was first formally described in 1923 by the botanist Karel Domin in Vestnik Kralovske Ceske Spolecnosti Nauk, Trida Matematiko-Prirodevedecke from specimens collected by Walter Holinshed Ince. The specific epithet (inceana) honours the collector of the type specimens.

In 1995, Richard Cowan and Bruce Maslin described two subspecies of A. inceana and in 2007 Maslin described a further subspecies, and the names are accepted by the Australian Plant Census:

- Acacia inceana subsp. conformis has subterete to flat phyllodes 1–2 mm (0.039–0.079 in) wide.
- Acacia inceana subsp. inceana has perfectly terete phyllodes.
- Acacia inceana subsp. latifolia has subterete to flat phyllodes 3–6 mm (0.12–0.24 in) wide.

== Distribution ==
This species of wattle grows on the edges of salt lake, salt pans, flats and plains in the Avon Wheatbelt, Coolgardie, Murchison and Yalgoo bioregions mainly in inland regions of Western Australia.

- Subsp. conformis occurs from near Morawa, south-east to Hines Hill and east to Boorabbin and is a highly salt-tolerant species.
- Subsp. inceana main occurs within 35 km (22 mi) north and east of Kalgoorlie where it grows in red soil with scattered eucalypts, rarely in saline habitats.
- Subsp. latifolia is restricted to an area east of Wubin, where it grows in sandy loam near the edge of saline areas dominated by samphires.

== Conservation status ==
Acacia inceana and two of its subspecies are listed as 'not threatened', but subsp. latifolia is listed as 'Priority One' by the Government of Western Australia Department of Biodiversity, Conservation and Attractions, meaning that it is known from only one or a few locations where it is potentially at risk.

== See also ==
- List of Acacia species
