= Acacia wilcoxii =

Scientific classification
- Kingdom: Plantae
- Clade: Embryophytes
- Clade: Tracheophytes
- Clade: Angiosperms
- Clade: Eudicots
- Clade: Rosids
- Order: Fabales
- Family: Fabaceae
- Subfamily: Caesalpinioideae
- Clade: Mimosoid clade
- Genus: Acacia
- Species: A. wilcoxii

Binomial name
- Acacia wilcoxii Maslin

Species of plant

Acacia wilcoxii is a shrub of the genus Acacia and the subgenus Phyllodineae. It is native to an area in the Mid West and Goldfields-Esperance regions of Western Australia.

The multi-branched shrub typically grows to a height of 2 to 4 metres (7 to 13 ft). It blooms from August to September and produces yellow flowers.

== See also ==
- List of Acacia species
