= Acacia peregrinalis =

Scientific classification
- Kingdom: Plantae
- Clade: Tracheophytes
- Clade: Angiosperms
- Clade: Eudicots
- Clade: Rosids
- Order: Fabales
- Family: Fabaceae
- Subfamily: Caesalpinioideae
- Clade: Mimosoid clade
- Genus: Acacia
- Species: A. peregrinalis

Binomial name
- Acacia peregrinalis M.W.McDonald & Maslin

Species of legume

Acacia peregrinalis, also known as New Guinea salwood, is a tree belonging to the genus Acacia and the subgenus Juliflorae that is native to New Guinea.

The slender tree typically grows to a height of 15 to 35 m (49 to 115 ft). It is found in areas of savannah, monsoon forest or rain forest in areas that are flooded during the wet season where it grows in stony or sandy soils.

== See also ==
- List of Acacia species
