= Acacia subrigida =

Scientific classification
- Kingdom: Plantae
- Clade: Tracheophytes
- Clade: Angiosperms
- Clade: Eudicots
- Clade: Rosids
- Order: Fabales
- Family: Fabaceae
- Subfamily: Caesalpinioideae
- Clade: Mimosoid clade
- Genus: Acacia
- Species: A. subrigida

Binomial name
- Acacia subrigida Maslin
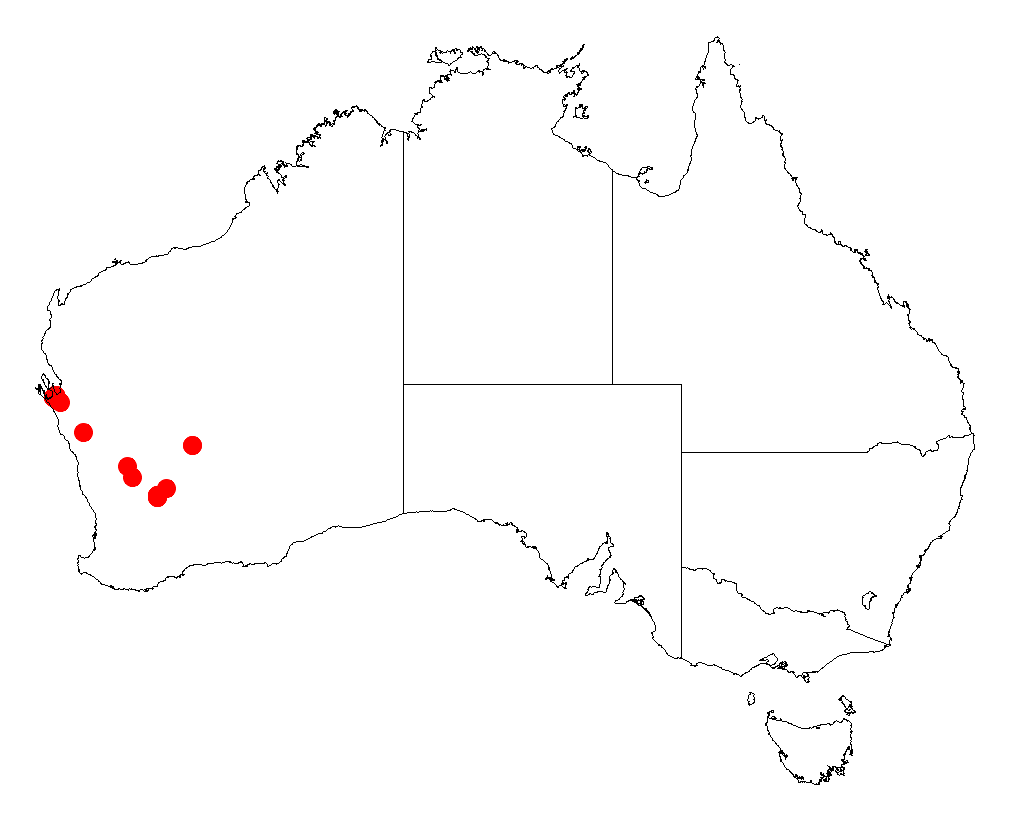
- Occurrence data from AVH

Species of legume

Acacia subrigida is a shrub of the genus Acacia and the subgenus Phyllodineae. It is native to an area in the Wheatbelt, Mid West and Goldfields-Esperance regions of Western Australia.

The erect shrub typically grows to a height of 1 to 3 metres (3 to 10 ft). It blooms from August to October and produces yellow flowers.

== See also ==
- List of Acacia species
