= Acacia curryana =

Suzanne’s golden-pod wattle

Conservation status
- Priority One — Poorly Known Taxa (DEC)

Scientific classification
- Kingdom: Plantae
- Clade: Tracheophytes
- Clade: Angiosperms
- Clade: Eudicots
- Clade: Rosids
- Order: Fabales
- Family: Fabaceae
- Subfamily: Caesalpinioideae
- Clade: Mimosoid clade
- Genus: Acacia
- Species: A. curryana

Binomial name
- Acacia curryana Maslin

Synonyms
- Acacia sp. Minnie Creek (B.R.Maslin 5217) WA HerbariumP1

Species of legume

Acacia curryana, also known as Suzanne’s golden-pod wattle, is a species of flowering plant in the family Fabaceae and is endemic to northern inland Western Australia. It is a conical or rounded, many-stemmed shrub with a dense crown, twisted stems and main branches, grey bark, leathery elliptic to egg-shaped phyllodes, short cylindrical spikes of flowers and broadly oblong, crusty to more or less woody pods.

== Description ==
Acacia curryana is a conical or rounded, many-stemmed shrub that typically grows to a height of 1.5–2.5 m (4 ft 11 in – 8 ft 2 in) with a dense crown, twisted main stems and branches and grey bark. Its branchlets are covered with silky hairs at first, later glabrous. The phyllodes are leathery, elliptic to egg-shaped with the narrower end towards the base, mostly 20–30 mm (0.79–1.18 in) long, 10–20 mm (0.39–0.79 in) wide and covered with silky hairs when young. The flowers are borne in short, cylindrical spikes on a peduncle 4–8 mm (0.16–0.31 in) long, but are otherwise not recorded. The pods are crusty to more or less woody, broadly oblong, 30–70 mm (1.2–2.8 in) long and 11–18 mm (0.43–0.71 in) wide and densely covered with golden hairs at first, and recorded in October. The seeds are 8–9 mm (0.31–0.35 in) long, flat and brown.

== Taxonomy ==
Acacia curryana was first formally described in 2014 by Bruce Maslin in the journal Nuytsia from specimens collected near Minnie Creek Station in 2007. The specific epithet (currana) honours Suzanne Curry, who assisted the author with Acacia research in th 1980's.

== Distribution ==
This species of wattle grows on low granite hills in brown clayey loam in run-off sites on Minnie Creek and Williambury Stations, about 200 km (120 mi) north-east of Carnarvon, in the Carnarvon bioregion and Gascoyne bioregion of north-western Western Australia.

== Conservation status ==
Acacia curryana is listed as "Priority One" by the Government of Western Australia Department of Biodiversity, Conservation and Attractions, meaning that it is known from only one or a few locations which are potentially at risk.

== See also ==
- List of Acacia species
