= Acacia subtiliformis =

Scientific classification
- Kingdom: Plantae
- Clade: Tracheophytes
- Clade: Angiosperms
- Clade: Eudicots
- Clade: Rosids
- Order: Fabales
- Family: Fabaceae
- Subfamily: Caesalpinioideae
- Clade: Mimosoid clade
- Genus: Acacia
- Species: A. subtiliformis

Binomial name
- Acacia subtiliformis Maslin
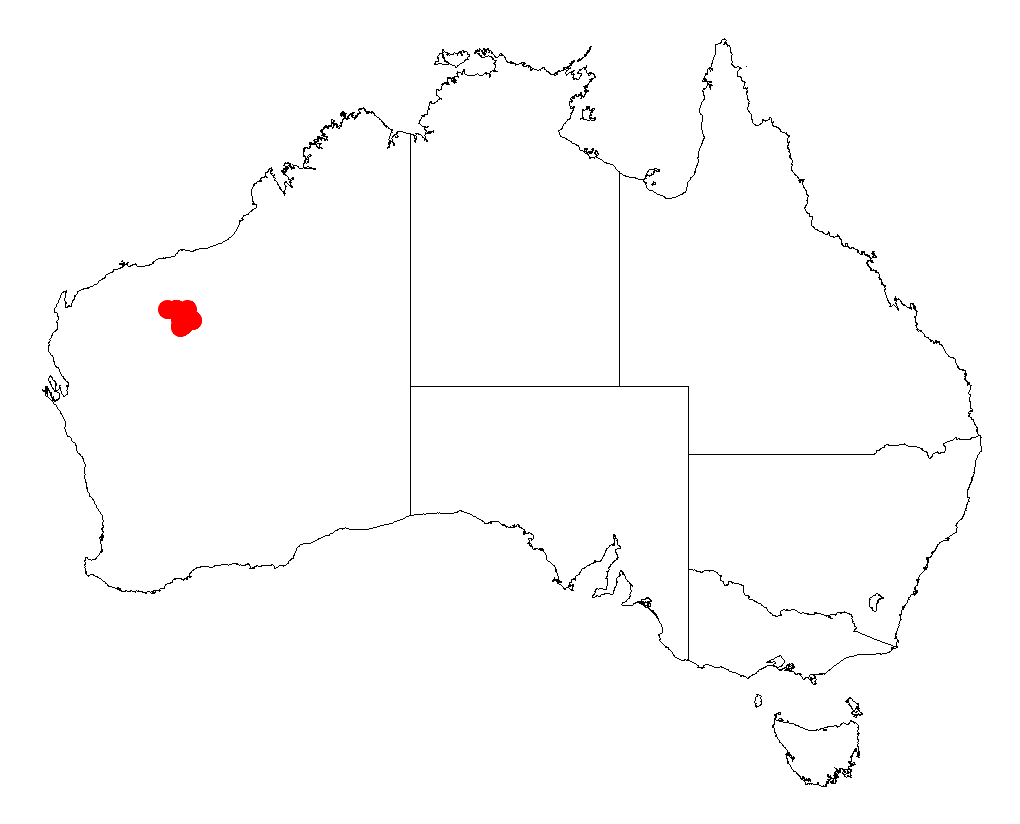
- Occurrence data from AVH

Species of legume

Acacia subtiliformis is a shrub of the genus Acacia and the subgenus Phyllodineae. It is native to an area in the Pilbara region of Western Australia.

The slender, spindly and erect shrub typically grows to a height of 3.5 metres (11 ft). It blooms in June and produces yellow flowers.

== See also ==
- List of Acacia species
