= Acacia coatesii =

Coates cushion wattle

Conservation status
- Priority One — Poorly Known Taxa (DEC)

Scientific classification
- Kingdom: Plantae
- Clade: Tracheophytes
- Clade: Angiosperms
- Clade: Eudicots
- Clade: Rosids
- Order: Fabales
- Family: Fabaceae
- Subfamily: Caesalpinioideae
- Clade: Mimosoid clade
- Genus: Acacia
- Species: A. coatesii

Binomial name
- Acacia coatesii Maslin

Synonyms
- Acacia sp. Londonderry (N.Gibson 6433) WA Herbarium

Species of legume

Acacia coatesii, commonly known as Coates cushion wattle, is a species of flowering plant in the family Fabaceae and is endemic to a small area in inland Western Australia. It is a low-domed, intricately branched, compact, rigid shrub with lance-shaped to narrowly elliptic or oblong phyllodes, spherical heads of bright golden yellow flowers, and oblong pods.

== Description ==
Acacia coatesii is a low-domed, intricately branched, compact, rigid shrub that typically grows to a height of 20–40 cm (7.9–15.7 in) and forms hemispherical cushions. Its phyllodes are usually straight, lance-shaped to narrowly elliptic or oblong, 6–15 mm (0.24–0.59 in) long and 1.5–3 mm (0.059–0.118 in) wide with a prominent vein. The flowers are borne in spherical heads on a peduncle 3–4 mm (0.12–0.16 in) long, each head 3–4 mm (0.12–0.16 in) in diameter with 8 or 9 bright golden yellow flowers. Flowering occurs in September and October and the immature pods are oblong, 10–15 mm (0.39–0.59 in) long and 3–4 mm (0.12–0.16 in) wide.

== Taxonomy ==
Acacia coatesii was first formally described in 2014 by Bruce Maslin from specimens collected south of Coolgardie in 2012. The specific epithet (coatesii) honours "Dr David (Dave) Coates, senior principal research scientist with the Department of Parks and Wildlife, in recognition of his major contribution to science and the conservation of Western Australian flora".

== Distribution and habitat ==
Coates cushion wattle is known only from a single population south of Coolgardie, where it grows in red sandy clay on flat or gently sloping ground in open woodland over open shrubland.

== Conservation status ==
Acacia coatesii is listed as "Priority One" by the Government of Western Australia Department of Biodiversity, Conservation and Attractions, meaning that it is known from only one or a few locations where it is potentially at risk.

== See also ==
- List of Acacia species
