= Acacia collegialis =

Southern rock wattle

Scientific classification
- Kingdom: Plantae
- Clade: Tracheophytes
- Clade: Angiosperms
- Clade: Eudicots
- Clade: Rosids
- Order: Fabales
- Family: Fabaceae
- Subfamily: Caesalpinioideae
- Clade: Mimosoid clade
- Genus: Acacia
- Species: A. collegialis

Binomial name
- Acacia collegialis Maslin

Synonyms
- Acacia sp. Norseman (B.Archer 1554) WA Herbarium

Species of legume

Acacia collegialis, also known as southern rock wattle, is a species of flowering plant in the family Fabaceae and is endemic to inland Western Australia. It is a spreading shrub or tree with narrowly elliptic phyllodes, oblong to shortly cylindrical spikes of golden yellow flowers, and linear to narrowly oblong, thinly leathery to crust-like pods.

== Description ==
Acacia collegialis is a spreading shrub or tree that typically grows to a height of 2.5–6 m (8 ft 2 in – 19 ft 8 in) and has fibrous, dark gray, fissured bark. Its phyllodes are narrowly elliptic, 50–85 mm (2.0–3.3 in) long and 4–7 mm (0.16–0.28 in) wide with a prominent central vein. The flowers are borne in oblong to shortly cylindrical spikes on peduncles 2–6 mm (0.079–0.236 in) long, each spike 5–9 mm (0.20–0.35 in) long with golden yellow flowers. Flowering occurs from April to August and the pods are linear to narrowly oblong, thinly leathery to crust-like, 40–80 mm (1.6–3.1 in) long and 4–6 mm (0.16–0.24 in) wide. The seeds are mostly oblong, 4–6 mm (0.16–0.24 in) long with a creamy white aril.

== Taxonomy ==
Acacia collegialis was first formally described in 2014 by Bruce Maslin from specimens collected on Cherry Tree Island on the western sie of Lake Cowan about 5 km (3.1 mi) west of Norseman in 2013. The specific epithet (collegialis) means 'collegial', acknowledging the assistance and advice the author received from colleagues.

== Distribution and habitat ==
Southern rock wattle occurs from Coolgardie to Karonie about 100 km (62 mi) east of Kalgoorlie and south to near Norseman, where it grows in shallow sandy clay-loam in open tall shrubland or low woodland, in the Coolgardie and Murchison bioregions of inland Western Australia.

== Conservation status ==
Acacia collegialis is listed as "not threatened" by the Government of Western Australia Department of Biodiversity, Conservation and Attractions.

== See also ==
- List of Acacia species
