= Acacia varia =

Scientific classification
- Kingdom: Plantae
- Clade: Tracheophytes
- Clade: Angiosperms
- Clade: Eudicots
- Clade: Rosids
- Order: Fabales
- Family: Fabaceae
- Subfamily: Caesalpinioideae
- Clade: Mimosoid clade
- Genus: Acacia
- Species: A. varia

Binomial name
- Acacia varia Maslin
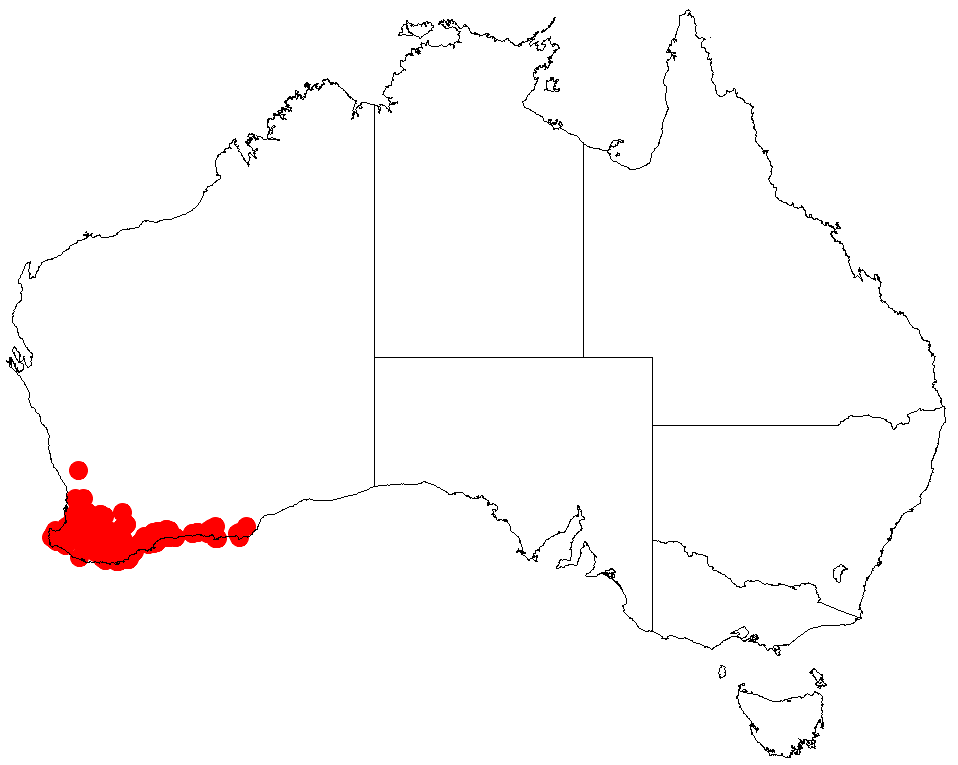
- Occurrence data from AVH

Species of legume

Acacia varia is a shrub of the genus Acacia and the subgenus Pulchellae that is endemic to an area of southwestern Australia.

== Description ==
The shrub typically grows to a height of 0.2 to 0.6 metres (0.7 to 2.0 ft) blooms in from May to October producing cream-white flowers.

=== Varieties ===
There are three varieties:

- Acacia varia var. crassinervis
- Acacia varia var. parviflora
- Acacia varia var. varia

== Distribution ==
It is native to an area in the South West, Goldfields-Esperance and Great Southern regions of Western Australia where it is commonly situated on hills, rises and ridges growing in sandy, loamy or clay loam soils that can contain lateritic gravel.

== See also ==
- List of Acacia species
