= Acacia lapidosa =

Mount Magnet rock wattle

Conservation status
- Priority One — Poorly Known Taxa (DEC)

Scientific classification
- Kingdom: Plantae
- Clade: Embryophytes
- Clade: Tracheophytes
- Clade: Spermatophytes
- Clade: Angiosperms
- Clade: Eudicots
- Clade: Rosids
- Order: Fabales
- Family: Fabaceae
- Subfamily: Caesalpinioideae
- Clade: Mimosoid clade
- Genus: Acacia
- Species: A. lapidosa

Binomial name
- Acacia lapidosa Maslin

Species of legume

Acacia lapidosa, commonly known as Mount Magnet rock wattle, is a species of flowering plant in the family Fabaceae and is endemic to a small area near Mount Magnet in the inland of Western Australia. It is an erect, inverted conical or rounded, more or less twisted shrub with many branches, narrowly linear phyllodes, and narrowly oblong to broadly linear pods rounded over the seeds.

== Description ==
Acacia lapidosa is an erect, inverted conical or rounded, more or less twisted shrub that typically grows to a height of 1–3.5 m (3 ft 3 in – 11 ft 6 in) and has many stems, the main stems and branches somewhat contorted. Its phyllodes are narrowly linear, straight to slightly curved or slightly s-shaped, 60–95 mm (2.4–3.7 in) long, 1.0–1.5 mm (0.039–0.059 in) wide, flat to compressed or subterete. The flowers have not been seen. The pods are narrowly oblong to broadly linear, 40–130 mm (1.6–5.1 in) long, 7–9.5 mm (0.28–0.37 in) wide, firmly leathery to almost woody, brown to very dark brown, and rounded over the seeds. The seeds are oblong to elliptic, mostly 8–10 mm (0.31–0.39 in) long and 5–7.5 mm (0.20–0.30 in) wide, dark brown to black with a small aril on the end.

== Taxonomy ==
Acacia lapidosa was first formally described in 2014 by Bruce Maslin in he journal Nuytsia from specimens he collected north of Mount Magnet in 1994. The specific epithet (lapidosa) means 'stony', alluding to the habitat of the species.

== Distribution and habitat ==
Mount Magnet rock wattle grows in poor soils derived from igneous rocks, on ridges and plains in open shrubland, with a range of other wattles.

== Conservation status ==
Acacia lapidosa is listed as 'Priority One' by the Government of Western Australia Department of Biodiversity, Conservation and Attractions, meaning that it is known from only one or a few locations where it is potentially at risk.

== See also ==
- List of Acacia species
