= Swartzia littlei =

Conservation status
- Endangered (IUCN 3.1)

Scientific classification
- Kingdom: Plantae
- Clade: Tracheophytes
- Clade: Angiosperms
- Clade: Eudicots
- Clade: Rosids
- Order: Fabales
- Family: Fabaceae
- Subfamily: Faboideae
- Genus: Swartzia
- Species: S. littlei

Binomial name
- Swartzia littlei R.S.Cowan

Species of legume

Swartzia littlei is a species of flowering plant in the family Fabaceae. It is endemic and found only in Ecuador. Its natural habitat is subtropical or tropical moist lowland forests.

Its wood is very hard and was used for railway ties in the northern Ecuadorian coast.
