= Acacia thieleana =

Scientific classification
- Kingdom: Plantae
- Clade: Tracheophytes
- Clade: Angiosperms
- Clade: Eudicots
- Clade: Rosids
- Order: Fabales
- Family: Fabaceae
- Subfamily: Caesalpinioideae
- Clade: Mimosoid clade
- Genus: Acacia
- Species: A. thieleana

Binomial name
- Acacia thieleana Maslin

Species of legume

Acacia thieleana is a shrub of the genus Acacia and is native to an area in Western Australia.

== See also ==
- List of Acacia species
