= Acacia plautella =

Conservation status
- Priority Three — Poorly Known Taxa (DEC)

Scientific classification
- Kingdom: Plantae
- Clade: Tracheophytes
- Clade: Angiosperms
- Clade: Eudicots
- Clade: Rosids
- Order: Fabales
- Family: Fabaceae
- Subfamily: Caesalpinioideae
- Clade: Mimosoid clade
- Genus: Acacia
- Species: A. plautella

Binomial name
- Acacia plautella Maslin
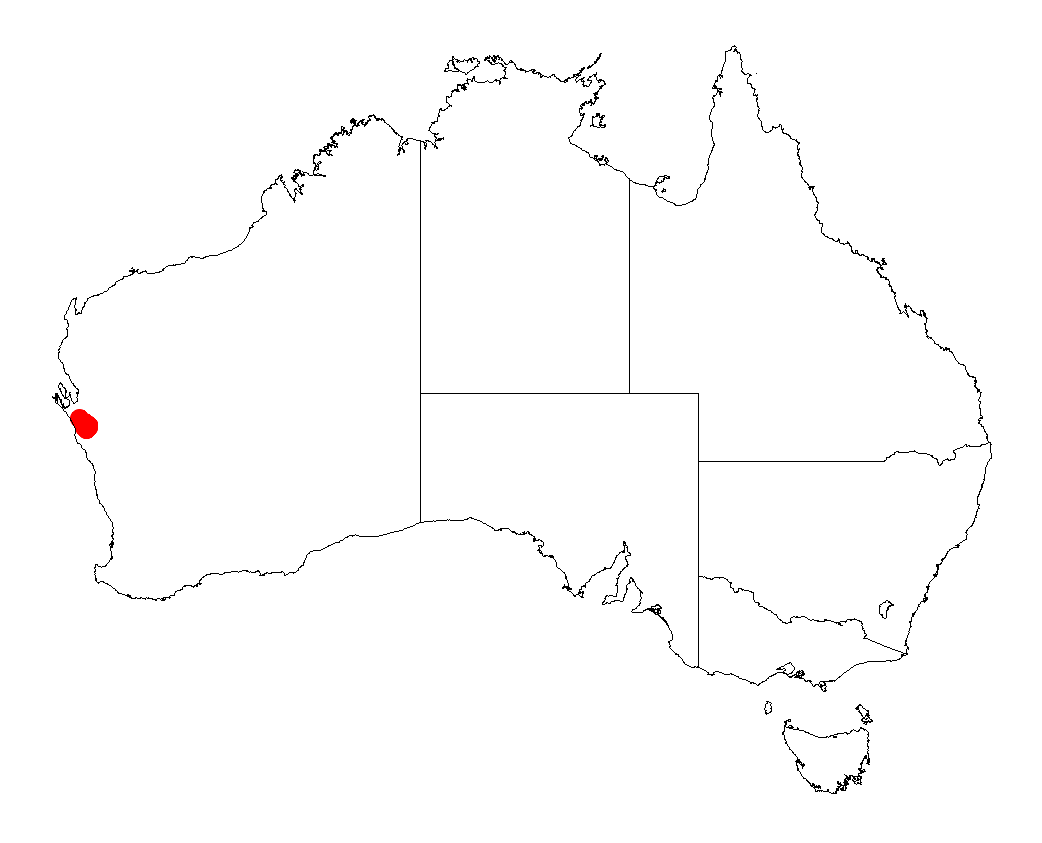
- Occurrence data from AVH

Species of legume

Acacia plautella is a shrub belonging to the genus Acacia and the subgenus Phyllodineae that is endemic to a small area along the coast of western Australia.

== Description ==
The spreading and pungent shrub typically grows to a height of 0.6 to 1.0 metre (2.0 to 3.3 ft). It has glabrous branchlets with a white epidermis that exfoliates as it ages and with caducous stipules. Like most species of Acacia it has phyllodes rather than true leaves. The sessile, rigid, pungent and evergreen phyllodes have a linear to triangular shape with a length of 5 to 15 mm (0.20 to 0.59 in) and a width of 1.5 to 2 mm (0.059 to 0.079 in) with one main nerve and an obscure second nerve parallel to the midrib. It produces yellow flowers. The rudimentary inflorescences usually occur on single headed racemes and have spherical flower-heads containing 15 to 20 golden coloured flowers. The thinly coriaceous, glabrous and red to brown coloured seed pods that form after flowering resemble a string of beads up to a length of 7.5 cm (3.0 in) and a width of 3.5 to 4 mm (0.14 to 0.16 in). The black and cream coloured seeds inside have an oblong to obovate shape with a length of 3 to 4 mm (0.12 to 0.16 in) with a conical aril.

== Taxonomy ==
The species was first formally described by the botanist Bruce Maslin in 1999 as part of the work Acacia miscellany. The taxonomy of fifty-five species of Acacia, primarily Western Australian, in section Phyllodineae. as published in the journal Nuytsia. It was reclassified as Racosperma plautellum by Leslie Pedley in 2003 and then transferred back to genus Acacia in 2014.

== Distribution ==
It is native to an area in the Mid West region of Western Australia that s commonly situated on sand-plains growing in yellow sandy soils where its range extends from around Shark Bay in the north to around Northampton in the south in an area approximately 50 km (31 mi) north of the Murchison River where it is a part of mallee scrubland communities.

== See also ==
- List of Acacia species
