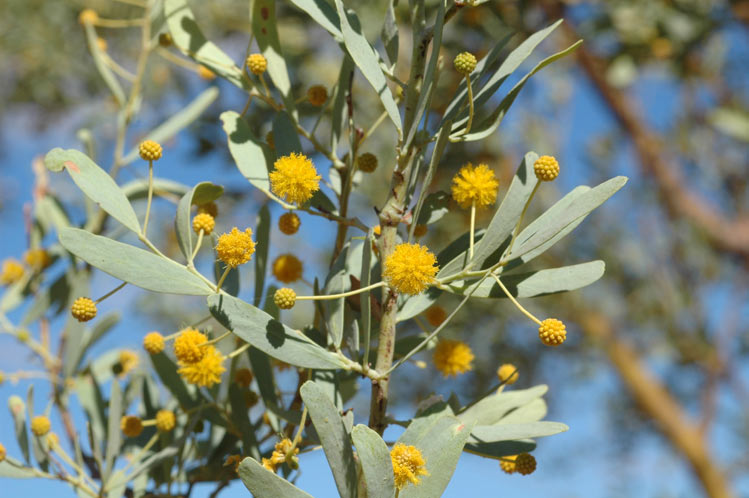
- In the Pilbara region

Scientific classification
- Kingdom: Plantae
- Clade: Embryophytes
- Clade: Tracheophytes
- Clade: Spermatophytes
- Clade: Angiosperms
- Clade: Eudicots
- Clade: Rosids
- Order: Fabales
- Family: Fabaceae
- Subfamily: Caesalpinioideae
- Clade: Mimosoid clade
- Genus: Acacia
- Species: A. synchronicia

Binomial name
- Acacia synchronicia Maslin
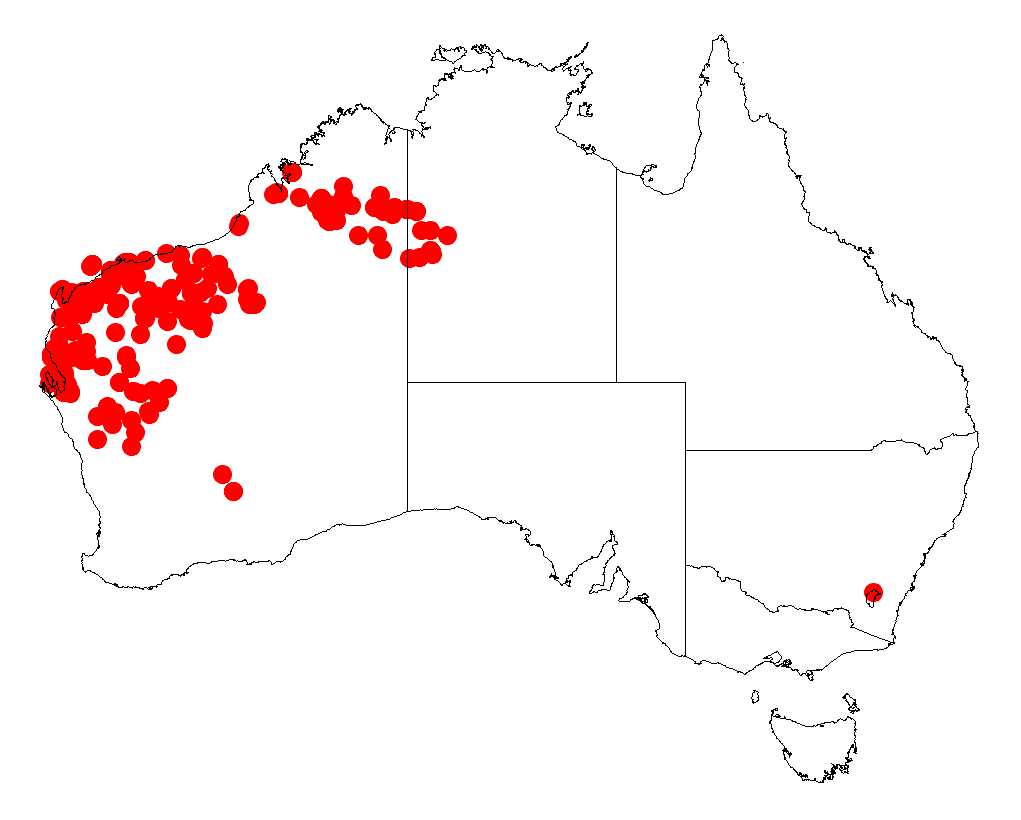
- Occurrence data from AVH

= Acacia synchronicia =

Species of legume

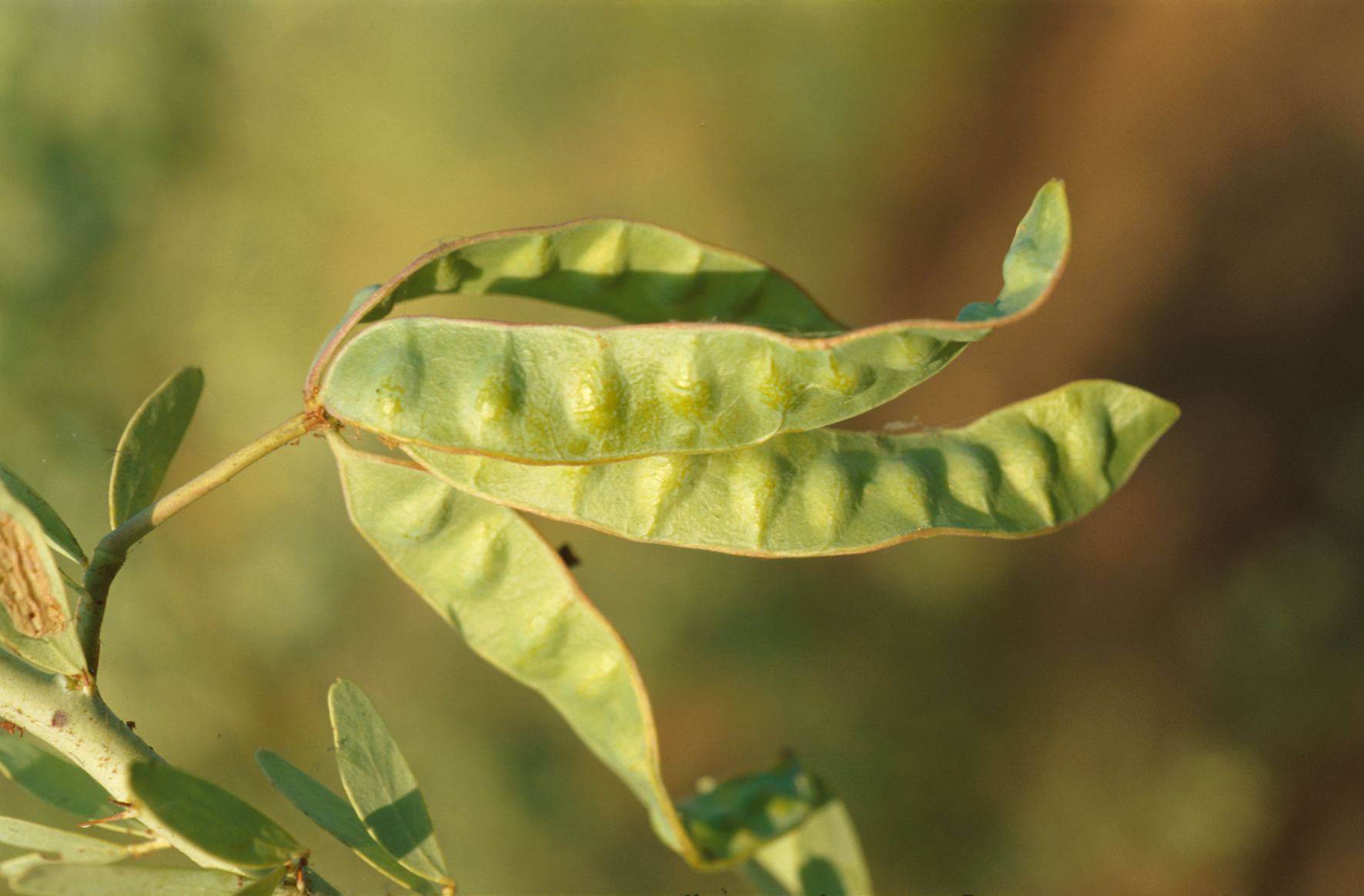
Seed pod

Acacia synchronicia, commonly known as bardi bush, is a shrub or tree of the genus Acacia and the subgenus Phyllodineae endemic to Australia.

== Description ==
The spreading spinescent shrub or tree typically grows to a height of 1.5 to 4 metres (5 to 13 ft) but can be as high as 6 m (20 ft). It has an openly branched habit with one or many main stems arising from the base. The grey bark is longitudinally fissured at the base of the main stems and is smoother on the upper branches and can be bronze through to yellowish orange or green in colour. It blooms from August to December and produces yellow flowers.

== Taxonomy ==
The species was first formally described by the botanist Bruce Maslin in 1992 as part of the work Acacia Miscellany 6. Review of Acacia victoriae and related species (Leguminosae: Mimosoideae: Section Phyllodineae) as published in the journal Nuytsia. It was reclassified by Leslie Pedley in 2003 as Racosperma synchronicium then transferred back to the genus Acacia in 2007.

== Distribution ==
It has a scattered distribution in the Kimberley, Pilbara, Mid West and Goldfields-Esperance regions of Western Australia extending into western parts of the Northern Territory where it is often found on alluvial flats, in depressions, on stony plains and along watercourses growing in rocky sand, clay or loam soils around areas of limestone or quartz.

== See also ==
- List of Acacia species
