= Acacia willingii =

Scientific classification
- Kingdom: Plantae
- Clade: Tracheophytes
- Clade: Angiosperms
- Clade: Eudicots
- Clade: Rosids
- Order: Fabales
- Family: Fabaceae
- Subfamily: Caesalpinioideae
- Clade: Mimosoid clade
- Genus: Acacia
- Species: A. willingii

Binomial name
- Acacia willingii Lewington & Maslin

Species of legume

Acacia willingii commonly known as Willing’s Wattle, is a shrub belonging to the genus Acacia and the subgenus Juliflorae. It is native to a small area in the Kimberley region of Western Australia specifically in the Wade Ck area. It is listed as Priority One species under the Department of Environment and Conservation's Conservation Codes for Western Australian flora.

== Ecology ==
The shrub typically grows to a height of 3 to 7 metres (10 to 23 ft) and produces yellow flowers. Pods are 3.5- 8 cm long and 6 -7.5 mm wide which appear narrowly oblong and flat but it is prominently rounded over seeds.

== Habitat ==
This shrub grows in the crevices of horizontal sandstone with skeletal soils.

== See also ==
- List of Acacia species
