= Acacia dilloniorum =

Wilgie Mia wattle

Conservation status
- Priority One — Poorly Known Taxa (DEC)

Scientific classification
- Kingdom: Plantae
- Clade: Tracheophytes
- Clade: Angiosperms
- Clade: Eudicots
- Clade: Rosids
- Order: Fabales
- Family: Fabaceae
- Subfamily: Caesalpinioideae
- Clade: Mimosoid clade
- Genus: Acacia
- Species: A. dilloniorum

Binomial name
- Acacia dilloniorum Maslin

Species of legume

Acacia dilloniorum also known as Wilgie Mia wattle, is a species of flowering plant in the family Fabaceae and is endemic to a small area of inland Western Australia. It is an intricately branched shrub with branches dividing into many short, rigid, sharply pointed branchlets, crowded elliptic, oblong, egg-shaped or lance-shaped phyllodes, spherical to oval heads of yellow flowers and narrowly oblong, leathery pods.

== Description ==
Acacia dilloniorum is an intricately branched shrub that typically grows to a height of 0.5–1.8 m (1 ft 8 in – 5 ft 11 in), its branches glabrous and dividing into many short, straight, rigid, sharply pointed branchlets. Its phyllodes are crowded, elliptic to oblong, egg-shaped to lance-shaped with the narrower end towards the base, mostly 7–12 mm (0.28–0.47 in) long and 3–5 mm (0.12–0.20 in) wide with a more or less prominent midrib and a gland near the base of the phyllodes. The flowers are yellow and borne in spherical to oblong heads on a peduncle 8–20 mm (0.31–0.79 in) long. The pods are narrowly oblong, 25–55 mm (0.98–2.17 in) long, 4.5–5.5 mm (0.18–0.22 in) wide, curved, leathery, reddish brown and glabrous. The seeds are oblong, 3.5–4.0 mm (0.14–0.16 in) long with an aril on one side of the seed.

== Taxonomy ==
Acacia dilloniorum was first formally described in 2014 by Bruce Maslin from specimens collected in the Weld Range, west of Cue in 2011. The specific epithet (dilloniorum) honours Steve Dillon and his wife Adrienne Markey, "in recognition of their excellent work during 2005 and 2008 in connection with surveys of greenstone belts and the BIF ranges in southern Western Australia.

== Distribution and habitat ==
Wilgie Mia wattle grows in red clay-loam on low ranges, often with outcropping basalt in tall, open shrubland and is only known from the Weld Range about 60 km (37 mi) north-west of Cue.

== Conservation status ==
Acacia dilloniorum is listed as "Priority One" by the Government of Western Australia Department of Biodiversity, Conservation and Attractions, meaning that it is known from only one or a few locations that are potentially at risk.

== See also ==
- List of Acacia species
