= Acacia carens =

Conservation status
- Priority Two — Poorly Known Taxa (DEC)

Scientific classification
- Kingdom: Plantae
- Clade: Tracheophytes
- Clade: Angiosperms
- Clade: Eudicots
- Clade: Rosids
- Order: Fabales
- Family: Fabaceae
- Subfamily: Caesalpinioideae
- Clade: Mimosoid clade
- Genus: Acacia
- Species: A. carens

Binomial name
- Acacia carens Maslin

Synonyms
- Racosperma carens (Maslin) Pedley

Species of legume

Acacia carens is a species of flowering plant in the family Fabaceae and is endemic to a small area near the coast of south-western Western Australia. It is an open, broom-like shrub with only a few phyllodes, often represented by tiny, stipule-like appendages, spherical heads of yellow flowers, and linear, curved, crust-like to woody pods.

== Description ==
Acacia carens is an open, broom-like shrub that typically grows to a height of up to 60 cm (24 in) and has striated, mostly glabrous branches. The phyllodes are mostly represented by narrowly triangular, to narrowly oblong stipules that are 0.5–1 mm (0.020–0.039 in) long. The flowers are borne in spherical heads in axils on a peduncle 2–5 mm (0.079–0.197 in) long, each head 8 mm (0.31 in) in diameter with 13 to 14 yellow flowers. Flowering occurs from April to June, and the pods are linear, curved, up to 100 mm (3.9 in) long and about 4 mm (0.16 in) wide and crust-like to more or less woody, containing oblong seeds about 5 mm (0.20 in) long with a cone-shaped aril on the end.

== Taxonomy ==
Acacia carens was first formally described in 1995 by the botanist Bruce Maslin in the journal Nuytsia from specimens collected in 1973. The specific epithet (carens) means 'lacking', referring to the absence of normal phyllodes on this plant.

== Distribution and habitat ==
This species of wattle is restricted to an area between Jurien Bay and Eneabba in the Geraldton Sandplains bioregions, where it grows on gravel in low heath.

== Conservation status ==
Acacia carens is listed as "Priority Two" by the Government of Western Australia Department of Biodiversity, Conservation and Attractions, meaning that it is poorly known and from one or a few locations.

== See also ==
- List of Acacia species
