= Acacia tetraptera =

Scientific classification
- Kingdom: Plantae
- Clade: Tracheophytes
- Clade: Angiosperms
- Clade: Eudicots
- Clade: Rosids
- Order: Fabales
- Family: Fabaceae
- Subfamily: Caesalpinioideae
- Clade: Mimosoid clade
- Genus: Acacia
- Species: A. tetraptera

Binomial name
- Acacia tetraptera Maslin
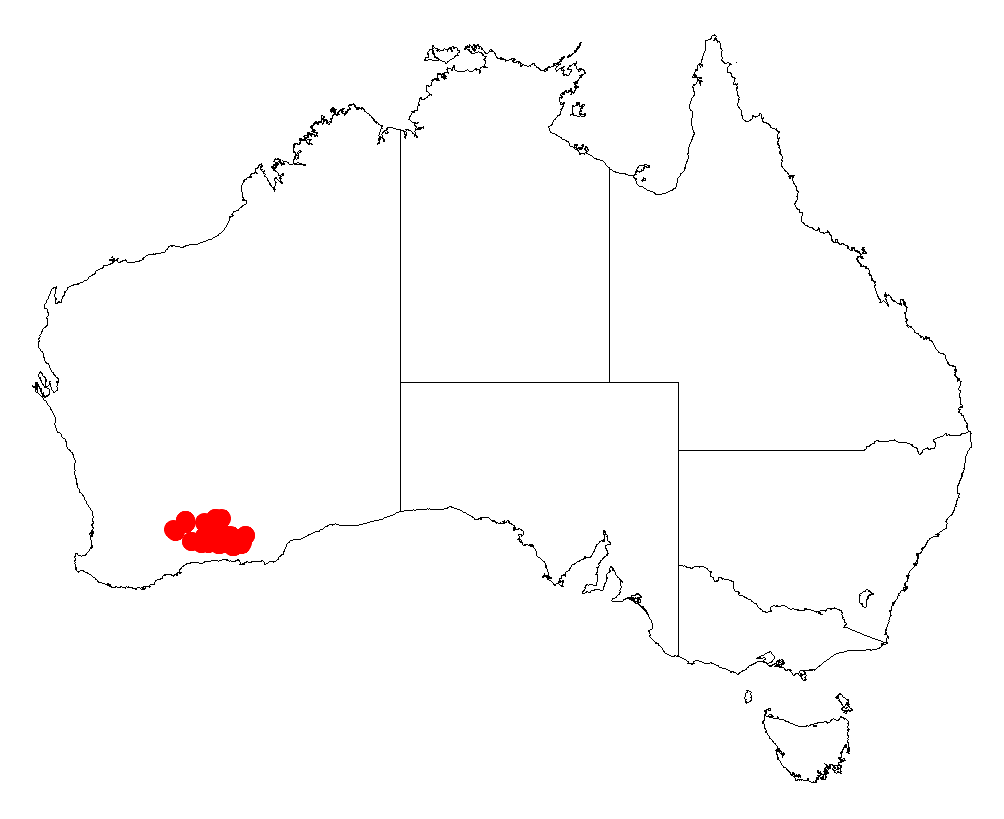
- Occurrence data from AVH

Species of legume

Acacia tetraptera is a shrub of the genus Acacia and the subgenus Phyllodineae. It is native to an area in the southern Wheatbelt and Goldfields-Esperance regions of Western Australia.

The spindly spreading shrub typically grows to a height of 0.2 to 0.6 metres (0.7 to 2.0 ft). It blooms from August to September and produces yellow flowers.

== See also ==
- List of Acacia species
