= Swartzia bombycina =

Conservation status
- Least Concern (IUCN 3.1)

Scientific classification
- Kingdom: Plantae
- Clade: Embryophytes
- Clade: Tracheophytes
- Clade: Spermatophytes
- Clade: Angiosperms
- Clade: Eudicots
- Clade: Rosids
- Order: Fabales
- Family: Fabaceae
- Subfamily: Faboideae
- Genus: Swartzia
- Species: S. bombycina

Binomial name
- Swartzia bombycina R.S.Cowan

Species of legume

Swartzia bombycina is a species of flowering plant in the family Fabaceae. It is found only in Ecuador. Its natural habitat is subtropical or tropical moist lowland forests.
