= Swartzia benthamiana =

Conservation status
- Least Concern (IUCN 3.1)

Scientific classification
- Kingdom: Plantae
- Clade: Tracheophytes
- Clade: Angiosperms
- Clade: Eudicots
- Clade: Rosids
- Order: Fabales
- Family: Fabaceae
- Subfamily: Faboideae
- Genus: Swartzia
- Species: S. benthamiana

Binomial name
- Swartzia benthamiana Miq.

Species of plant

Swartzia benthamiana is a species of flowering plant in the family Fabaceae.
