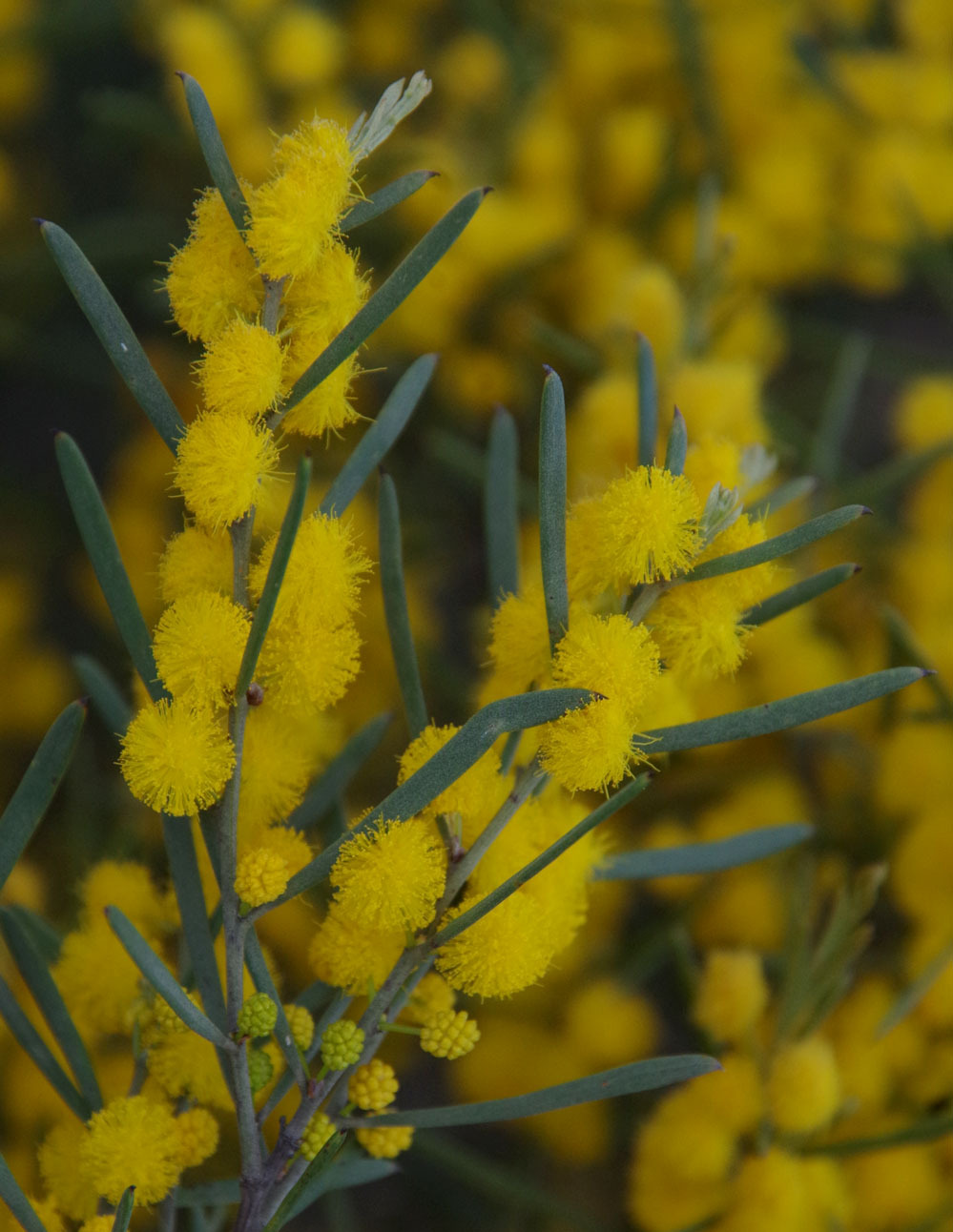

Scientific classification
- Kingdom: Plantae
- Clade: Embryophytes
- Clade: Tracheophytes
- Clade: Angiosperms
- Clade: Eudicots
- Clade: Rosids
- Order: Fabales
- Family: Fabaceae
- Subfamily: Caesalpinioideae
- Clade: Mimosoid clade
- Genus: Acacia
- Subgenus: Acacia subg. Plurinerves
- Species: A. lineolata

Binomial name
- Acacia lineolata Benth.
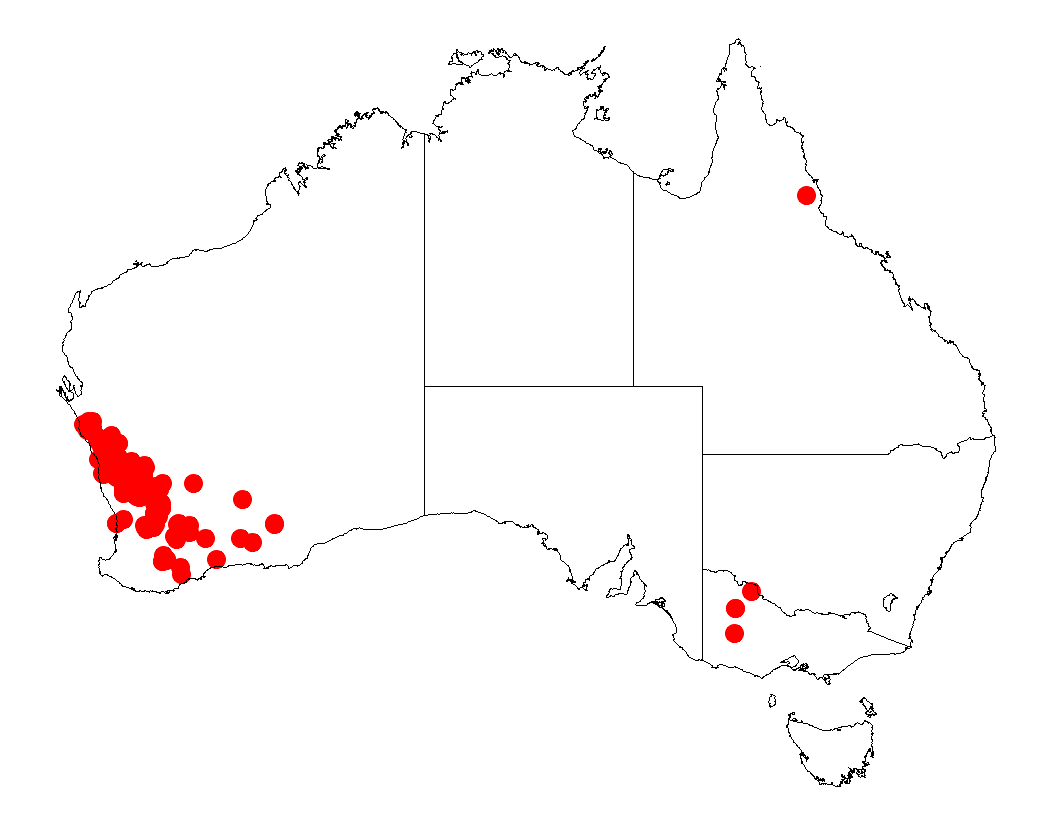
- Occurrence data from AVH

Synonyms
- Racosperma lineolatum (Benth.) Pedley

= Acacia lineolata =

Species of legume

Acacia lineolata, commonly known as dwarf myall, is a species of flowering plant in the family Fabaceae and is endemic to the south-west of Western Australia. It is a dense, rounded or inverted cone-shaped, sometimes openly branched shrub, with linear to lance-shaped or oblong, straight to curved or terete, leathery phyllodes, spherical or slightly oblong golden yellow flowers, and linear, thinly leathery or papery pods.

== Description ==
Acacia lineolata is a dense, rounded or inverted cone-shaped, sometimes openly branched shrub that typically grows to a height of 0.5–2 m (1 ft 8 in – 6 ft 7 in) and glabrous branchlets, or sometimes with soft hairs pressed against the surface. Its phyllodes are linear to lance-shaped with the narrower end towards the base, or oblong, straight to more or less curved, occasionally terete, mostly 20–65 mm (0.79–2.56 in) long and 2–5 mm (0.079–0.197 in) wide. The leaves are leathery, sometimes sharply pointed, with many closely parallel yellow veins. The flowers are borne in two spherical or slightly oblong heads, in axils on peduncles 2–11 mm (0.079–0.433 in) long. Each head is 4–6 mm (0.16–0.24 in) in diameter with 18 to 35 golden yellow flowers. Flowering occurs from June to September, and the pods are linear, straight to slightly curved, up to 100 mm (3.9 in) long, 2–3 mm (0.079–0.118 in) wide, and thinly leathery or papery. The seeds are elliptic to oblong, 3–4 mm (0.12–0.16 in) long, glossy brown or brownish-black with a bright yellow aril on the end.

== Taxonomy ==
Acacia lineolata was first formally described in 1855 by George Bentham in the journal Linnaea: Ein Journal für die Botanik in ihrem ganzen Umfange, oder Beiträge zur Pflanzenkunde from specimens collected by James Drummond. The specific epithet (lineolata) means 'marked with fine parallel lines', referring to the phyllodes.

In 1995, Bruce Maslin and Richard Cowan described two subspecies of A. lineolata in the journal Nuytsia, and the names are accepted by the Australian Plant Census:

- Acacia lineolata Benth. subsp. lineolata has phyllodes mostly 2–3 mm (0.079–0.118 in) long and peduncles 2–6 mm (0.079–0.236 in) long and flowers in August and September.
- Acacia lineolata subsp. multilineata (W.Fitzg.) R.S.Cowan & Maslin (previously known as A. multilineata) has phyllodes mostly 4–8 mm (0.16–0.31 in) long and peduncles 5–9 mm (0.20–0.35 in) long, and flowers from June to August .

== Distribution and habitat ==
Dwarf myall occurs between Yuna and Pingrup in the Avon Wheatbelt, Carnarvon, Coolgardie, Esperance Plains, Geraldton Sandplains, Mallee, Swan Coastal Plain and Yalgoo bioregions of south-western Western Australia where it grows on saline flats, sandplains and low-lying areas.

- Subspecies lineolata has a wide distribution from Kalbarri National Park to Pingrup, where it grows in sandy or stony loam with Casuarina and Halosarcia species and eucalypts.
- Subspecies multilineata has a more limited distribution and is only known from a few localities near Mullewa and near Arrino in the Avon Wheatbelt and Geraldton Sandplains bioregions, where it grows in sand and rocky clay on sandplains.

== Conservation status ==
Subspecies lineata is listed as 'not threatened' but subsp. multilineata is listed as 'Priority One' by the Government of Western Australia Department of Biodiversity, Conservation and Attractions, meaning that it is known from only one or a few locations that are potentially at risk.

== See also ==
- List of Acacia species
