= Swartzia robiniifolia =

Conservation status
- Least Concern (IUCN 3.1)

Scientific classification
- Kingdom: Plantae
- Clade: Embryophytes
- Clade: Tracheophytes
- Clade: Spermatophytes
- Clade: Angiosperms
- Clade: Eudicots
- Clade: Rosids
- Order: Fabales
- Family: Fabaceae
- Subfamily: Faboideae
- Genus: Swartzia
- Species: S. robiniifolia

Binomial name
- Swartzia robiniifolia Willd. ex Vogel

Species of legume

Swartzia robiniifolia is a species of flowering plant in the family Fabaceae. It is found only in Colombia.
