= Swartzia nuda =

Conservation status
- Endangered (IUCN 3.1)

Scientific classification
- Kingdom: Plantae
- Clade: Embryophytes
- Clade: Tracheophytes
- Clade: Spermatophytes
- Clade: Angiosperms
- Clade: Eudicots
- Clade: Rosids
- Order: Fabales
- Family: Fabaceae
- Subfamily: Faboideae
- Genus: Swartzia
- Species: S. nuda

Binomial name
- Swartzia nuda Schery

Species of legume

Swartzia nuda is a species of flowering plant in the family Fabaceae. It is found only in Panama. It is threatened by habitat loss.
