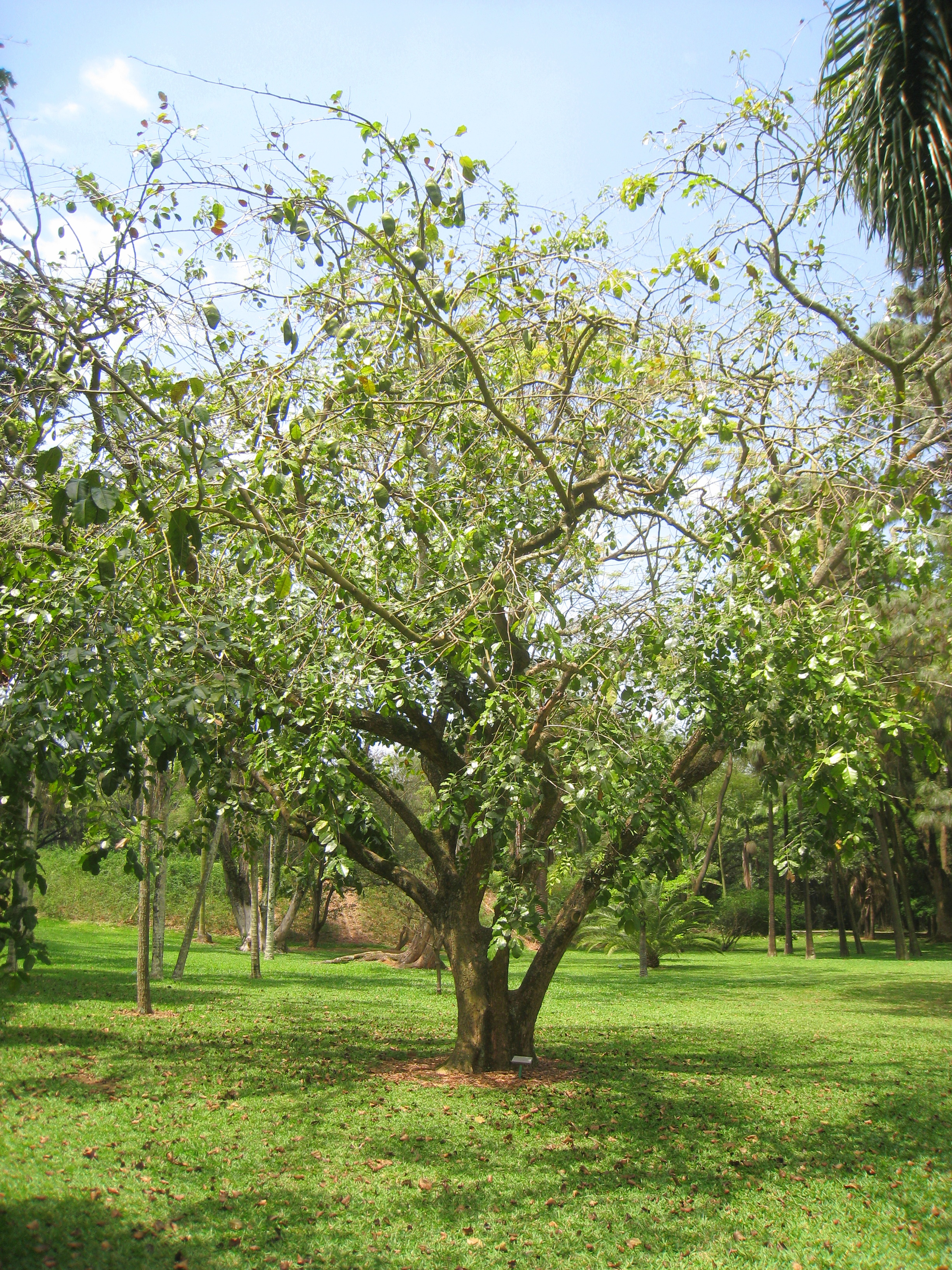
- Swartzia langsdorffii

Scientific classification
- Kingdom: Plantae
- Clade: Tracheophytes
- Clade: Angiosperms
- Clade: Eudicots
- Clade: Rosids
- Order: Fabales
- Family: Fabaceae
- Subfamily: Faboideae
- Tribe: Swartzieae
- Genus: Swartzia; Schreb. (1791), nom. cons.

Species
- See text

Synonyms
- Gynanthistrophe Poit. ex DC. (1825); Hoelzelia Neck. (1790), opus utique oppr.; Huertia Mutis (1957); Possira Aubl. (1775); Possura Aubl. ex Steud. (1841), not validly publ.; Rittera Schreb. (1789); Riveria Kunth (1825); Tounatea Aubl. (1775), nom. rej.; Tunatea Kuntze (1891), orth. var.

= Swartzia =

Genus of legumes

Swartzia is a genus of flowering plants in the family Fabaceae. It was named in honor of Swedish botanist Olof Swartz and contains about 200 species. Swartzia is restricted in its geographical distribution to the New World Tropics, where it occurs primarily in lowland rainforests, but also in savannas, pre-montane forests, and tropical dry forests. While it can be found throughout the wet lowlands from Mexico and the Caribbean islands to southern Brazil and Bolivia, Swartzia is most abundant and species-rich in Amazonia, where 10–20 species may co-occur at a single site. The species of Swartzia are mostly trees, ranging from small understory treelets to large canopy emergents. Some species, especially in savannas, are mult-stemmed shrubs.

== Fossil record ==
Many Swartzia fossils from the middle Eocene epoch are known from the United States. 5 fossil dehiscent seed pods and 50 fossil leaflets have been described from the Warman and Lawrence clay pits in Weakley and the Henry Counties, Tennessee. In addition 6 leaflets have been described from the New Lawrence and Miller clay pits in Henry County, Tennessee.

== List of species ==
More than 200 species have been described:

- Swartzia acreana R.S.Cowan
- Swartzia acuminata Willd. ex Vogel
- Swartzia acutifolia Vogel
- Swartzia alatosericea Barneby
- Swartzia alternifoliolata Mansano
- Swartzia amabale Torke, L.K.Ruíz & Mansano
- Swartzia amazonica S.Moore
- Swartzia amplifolia Harms
- Swartzia amshoffiana R.S.Cowan
- Swartzia angustifolia Schery
- Swartzia anomala R.S.Cowan
- Swartzia apetala Raddi
  - var. apetala Raddi
  - var. glabra (Vogel) R.S.Cowan
- Swartzia apiculata R.S.Cowan
- Swartzia aptera DC.
- Swartzia arborescens (Aubl.) Pittier
- Swartzia arenophila R.B.Pinto, Torke & Mansano
- Swartzia argentea Spruce ex Benth.
- Swartzia auriculata Poepp.
- Swartzia aymardii Barneby
- Swartzia bahiensis R. S. Cowan
- Swartzia bannia Sandwith
- Swartzia barnebyana Cuello
- Swartzia benthamiana Miq.
- Swartzia bombycina R. S. Cowan
- Swartzia brachyrachis Harms
- Swartzia buntingii R.S.Cowan
- Swartzia cabrerae R.S.Cowan
- Swartzia calva R.S.Cowan
- Swartzia canescens Torke
- Swartzia capixabensis Mansano
- Swartzia capparioides Klotzsch (unplaced)
- Swartzia cardiosperma Spruce ex Benth.
- Swartzia caribaea Griseb.
- Swartzia caudata R. S. Cowan
- Swartzia colombiana (R. S. Cowan) Torke
- Swartzia conferta Spruce ex Benth.
- Swartzia coriaceifolia Torke
- Swartzia corrugata Benth.
- Swartzia costata (Rusby) R. S. Cowan
- Swartzia cowanii Steyerm.
- Swartzia cubensis (Britton & P. Wilson) Standl.—katalox
- Swartzia cupavenensis R. S. Cowan
- Swartzia curranii R. S. Cowan
- Swartzia cuspidata Spruce ex Benth.
- Swartzia davisii Sandwith
- Swartzia decidua Torke & Á.J.Pérez
- Swartzia dipetala Willd. ex Vogel
- Swartzia discocarpa Ducke
- Swartzia duckei Huber
- Swartzia emarginata (Ducke) Torke
- Swartzia eriocarpa Benth.
- Swartzia euxylophora Rizzini & A.Mattos
- Swartzia fanshawei R. S. Cowan
- Swartzia fimbriata Ducke
- Swartzia flaemingii Raddi
- Swartzia flavescens Suess.
- Swartzia floribunda Benth.
- Swartzia foliolosa R.S.Cowan
- Swartzia fraterna R.S.Cowan
- Swartzia froesii R.S.Cowan
- Swartzia gigantea R.S.Cowan
- Swartzia glabrata (R.S.Cowan) Torke
- Swartzia glazioviana (Taub.) Glaz. ex R.S.Cowan
- Swartzia gracilis Pipoly & A.Rudas Lleras
- Swartzia grandifolia Bong. ex Benth.
- Swartzia guatemalensis (Donn.Sm.) Pittier
- Swartzia guianensis (Aubl.) Urb.
- Swartzia haughtii R.S.Cowan
- Swartzia hilairiana Mansano & Torke
- Swartzia hostmannii Benth.
- Swartzia humboldtiana Cuello
- Swartzia ingens Barneby
- Swartzia ingifolia Ducke
- Swartzia iniridensis R.S.Cowan
- Swartzia invenusta Barneby
- Swartzia jenmanii Sandwith
- Swartzia jimenezii R.S.Cowan
- Swartzia jororii Harms
- Swartzia juruana Torke
- Swartzia kaieteurensis (R.S.Cowan) Torke
- Swartzia katawa R.S.Cowan
- Swartzia klugii (R.S.Cowan) Torke
- Swartzia krukovii R.S.Cowan
- Swartzia laevicarpa Amshoff
- Swartzia lamellata Ducke
- Swartzia langsdorffii Raddi
- Swartzia latifolia Benth.
- Swartzia laurifolia Benth.
- Swartzia laxiflora Bong. ex Benth.
- Swartzia leiocalycina Benth.
- Swartzia leiogyne (Sandwith) Cowan
- Swartzia leptopetala Benth.
- Swartzia linharensis Mansano
- Swartzia littlei R. S. Cowan
- Swartzia longicarpa Amshoff
- Swartzia longipedicellata Sandwith
- Swartzia longistipitata Ducke
- Swartzia lucida R. S. Cowan
- Swartzia macrocarpa Benth.
- Swartzia macrophylla Vogel
- Swartzia macrosema Harms
- Swartzia macrostachya Benth.
- Swartzia magdalenae Britton & Killip
- Swartzia maguirei R.S.Cowan
- Swartzia manausensis Torke
- Swartzia mangabalensis R.S.Cowan
- Swartzia maquenqueana N.Zamora & D.Solano
- Swartzia martii Eichler
- Swartzia mazaganensis Ledoux
- Swartzia mexicana M. Sousa & R. Grether
- Swartzia micrantha R.S.Cowan
- Swartzia microcarpa Benth.
- Swartzia microstylis Benth.
- Swartzia monachiana R.S.Cowan
- Swartzia mucronifera R. S. Cowan
- Swartzia multijuga Vogel
- Swartzia multijuga Vogel
- Swartzia mutisii Britton & Killip
- Swartzia myrtifolia Sm.
  - var. elegans (Schott) R. S. Cowan
  - var. myrtifolia Sm.
- Swartzia nicaraguensis (Britton & Rose) Standl.
- Swartzia nuda Schery
- Swartzia oblanceolata Sandwith
- Swartzia oblata R. S. Cowan
- Swartzia oblonga Benth.
- Swartzia obscura Huber
- Swartzia oedipus Barneby
- Swartzia oraria R. S. Cowan
- Swartzia oriximinaensis R. S. Cowan
- Swartzia oscarpintoana Pipoly & Rudas
- Swartzia pachyphylla Harms
- Swartzia palustris Barneby
- Swartzia panacoco (Aubl.) R.S.Cowan
- Swartzia parvifolia Schery
- Swartzia parvipetala (R.S.Cowan) Mansano
- Swartzia pendula Benth.
- Swartzia pernitida R.S.Cowan
- Swartzia peruviana (R.S.Cowan) Torke
- Swartzia phaneroptera Standl.
- Swartzia piarensis R. S. Cowan
- Swartzia pickelii Ducke
- Swartzia picramnioides Standl. & L.O.Williams ex Torke & N.Zamora
- Swartzia picta Benth.
- Swartzia pilulifera Benth.
- Swartzia pinheiroana R.S.Cowan
- Swartzia pinnata (Vahl) Willd.
- Swartzia pittieri Schery
- Swartzia polita (R.S.Cowan) Torke
- Swartzia polyphylla DC.
- Swartzia prancei Torke & Mansano
- Swartzia prolata R.S.Cowan
- Swartzia psilonema Harms
- Swartzia racemosa Benth.
- Swartzia radiale Torke, L.K.Ruíz & Mansano
- Swartzia ramiflora Torke
- Swartzia recurva Poepp.
- Swartzia rediviva R.S.Cowan
- Swartzia remigera Amshoff
- Swartzia reticulata Ducke
- Swartzia riedelii R.S.Cowan
- Swartzia robiniifolia Vogel
- Swartzia roraimae Sandwith
- Swartzia rosea Mart. ex Benth.
- Swartzia rugosa Torke & Mansano
- Swartzia santanderensis R.S.Cowan
- Swartzia schomburgkii Benth.
  - var. rigida R. S. Cowan
  - var. schomburgkii Benth.
- Swartzia schultesii R.S.Cowan
- Swartzia schunkei R.S.Cowan
- Swartzia sericea Vogel
- Swartzia simplex (Sw.) Spreng.
  - var. grandiflora (Raddi) Cowan
  - var. ochnaceae (DC.) R. S. Cowan
  - var. simplex (Sw.) Spreng.
- Swartzia sprucei Benth.
- Swartzia standleyi (Britton & Rose) Standl.
- Swartzia steyermarkii R.S.Cowan
- Swartzia submarginata (Benth.) Mansano
- Swartzia submontana R.B.Pinto, Torke & Mansano
- Swartzia subspicata Klotzsch (unplaced)
- Swartzia sumorum Ant.Molina
- Swartzia surinamensis Klotzsch (unplaced)
- Swartzia tessmannii Harms
- Swartzia thomasii R.B.Pinto, Torke & Mansano
- Swartzia tillettii R.S.Cowan
- Swartzia tomentifera (Ducke) Ducke
- Swartzia trianae Benth.
- Swartzia trinitensis Urb.
- Swartzia triptera Barneby
- Swartzia ulei Harms
- Swartzia vaupesiana R.S.Cowan
- Swartzia velutina Spruce ex Benth.
- Swartzia versicolor Torke, L.K.Ruíz & Mansano
- Swartzia wurdackii R.S.Cowan
- Swartzia xanthopetala Sandwith
- Swartzia yasuniensis Torke & Á.J.Pérez
- Swartzia zeledonensis Torke & N. Zamora

Recent phylogenetic analyses have revealed several well-supported clades within Swartzia that roughly correspond to previously-erected sections and series in the genus.

=== Nomina dubia ===
The following species may or may not be valid:

- Swartzia arenarium Ducke
- Swartzia flabellipetala Pittier
- Swartzia microcalyx Ducke
- Swartzia shnilis Benoist
