= Richard Sumner Cowan =

American botanist (1921–1997)

- Born: January 23, 1921; Crawfordsville, Indiana
- Died: November 17, 1997 (aged 76)
- Education: Wabash College; Columbia University
- Awards: Commemorative Scroll Award (1988)
- Scientific career
- Fields: Botany
- Workplaces: New York Botanical Garden; International Congress of Systematic and Evolutionary Biology; Department of Botany
- Author abbrev. (botany): R.S.Cowan

Richard Sumner Cowan (January 23, 1921 – November 17, 1997) was an American botanist.

== Early life ==
Richard Sumner Cowan was born on January 23, 1921, in Crawfordsville, Indiana. His family moved to Florida and he was educated in the Tampa, Florida area. He returned to his birthplace in Indiana in 1938, and married Mary Frances Minnich in June 1941. In 1942 he received an AB degree from Wabash College. He joined the US Navy in 1943 and was deployed to the Pacific as a Seabee. While serving in the US Navy, he collected plants on Tinian Island, despite the danger of being shot. He earned his master's degree at the University of Hawaii in 1948, and then got a job at New York Botanical Garden. He joined two expeditions to Venezuela in search of tepuis. The first trip was 5 months long, beginning in October 1950. He completed his PhD in 1952 at Columbia University, after which he continued to work at the Botanical Garden. Richard went back to South America to gather some species in Amapa, Brazil, and French Guiana. There was also a period of time that Richard worked at the Kew Botanical Gardens in Richmond, Kew, England prior to moving back to the USA.

== Career ==
In May 1957, became an associate curator for the Department of Botany at the Smithsonian Institution, where he continued his work in South America. He then became the director of the Smithsonian Institution - Natural History Museum at a later date. In 1961 he was elected to the Washington Biologists' Field Club, and in the same year got a membership to the flora and fauna committee. He received several unexpected promotions while working for the Smithsonian: first, in 1962 he became an assistant director of the National Museum of Natural History, then in 1965 he became director of the museum, a position which he kept until 1972. Richard received a New York Botanical Garden Distinguished Service Award in 1968, and the same year was awarded with the Henry Allen Gleason Award from the New York Botanical Garden. The same year, he received another honor, a Smithsonian Institution Special Achievement Award for his Swartzia revision. Owing to his administrative skills, he was a secretary-general for the International Botanical Congress in Seattle in 1969. In 1972 he became an organizer for the International Congress of Systematic and Evolutionary Biology. He was appointed as a senior botanist in the Department of Botany in the same year. He was also recognized with a medal in 1979 for taxonomic literature, work he did for the National Agricultural Library.

== Retirement, marriage and death ==
Richard married Mary Frances Minnich in June 1941 and thereafter had a son Richard Ainesworth. Richard and Mary had a daughter Diedra Anne in September 1958 and adopted a son Charles Ian in 1961.

He retired on October 31, 1985, and headed for Australia in December. In 1986 he moved to Perth where he began a study of the Australian Acacia and other Australian mimosoids. In 1986, he married Roberta Townsend. In 1988 he was awarded the Commemorative Scroll Award from the Australian Systematic Botany Society for his work on Taxonomic Literature there. He received the Founder's Medal of the society in 1990 for the History and Bibliography of Natural History. He had a stroke in 1997, from which he recovered. After a fall, he died from the effects of brain trauma on November 17, 1997.

== Selected publications ==
- Stafleu, Frans A.; Cowan, Richard S. (1976–1988). Taxonomic literature: a selective guide to botanical publications and collections with dates, commentaries and types: Taxon. Lit., ed. 2 (TL2) (2nd ed.). Utrecht: Bohn, Scheltema & Holkema. ISBN 90-313-0224-4.
