= Bruce Maslin =

Australian botanist (born 1946)

Bruce Roger Maslin AM (born 3 May 1946) is an Australian botanist, known for his work on Acacia taxonomy.

Born in Bridgetown, Western Australia, he obtained an honours degree in botany from the University of Western Australia in 1967, then took up an appointment as a botanist with the Western Australian Herbarium. The following year he was conscripted to serve in the Vietnam War; he gave three years in National Service, serving in Vietnam in 1969. In 1970 he returned to his position at the Western Australian Herbarium, serving in that institution until 1987. During this time he was Australian Botanical Liaison Officer in 1977 and 1978; editor of Nuytsia from 1981 to 1983; and acting curator in 1986 and 1987. In 1987, Maslin was appointed a senior research scientist, still within the Department of Environment and Conservation.

A specialist in the genus Acacia, he has published around 250 Acacia taxa.

He retired from his position at the Western Australian Herbarium in 2017, after 48 years of service and more than 180 scientific papers and articles. He has continued his Acacia work as an Honorary Research Associate at the Herbarium and has conducted research in south, south-east and east Asia, dealing with the region's Acacia sens. lat taxonomy and nomenclature.

Bruce was awarded Member of the Order of Australia (AM) in 2017.
