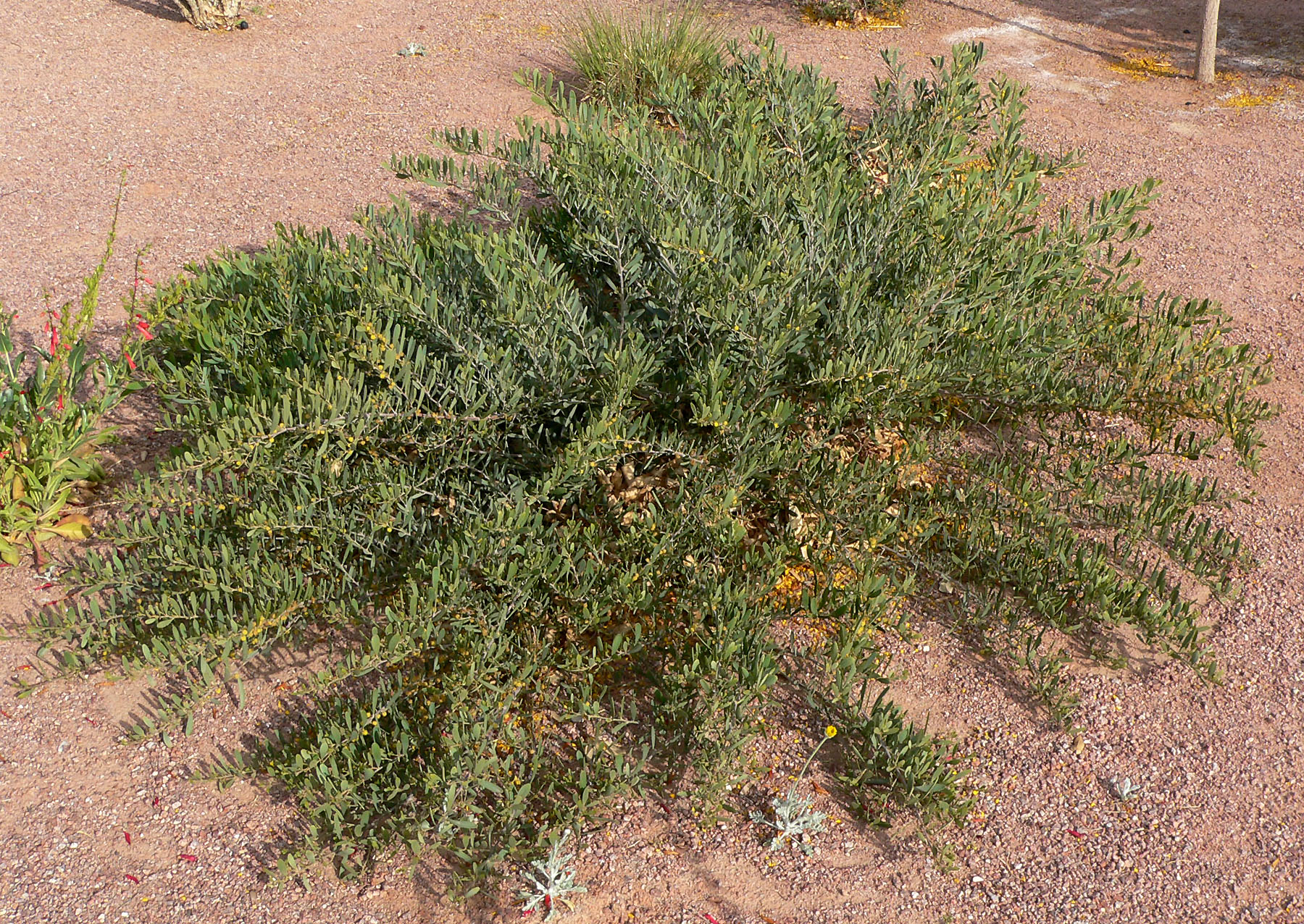

Scientific classification
- Kingdom: Plantae
- Clade: Tracheophytes
- Clade: Angiosperms
- Clade: Eudicots
- Clade: Rosids
- Order: Fabales
- Family: Fabaceae
- Subfamily: Caesalpinioideae
- Clade: Mimosoid clade
- Genus: Acacia
- Species: A. redolens

Binomial name
- Acacia redolens Maslin
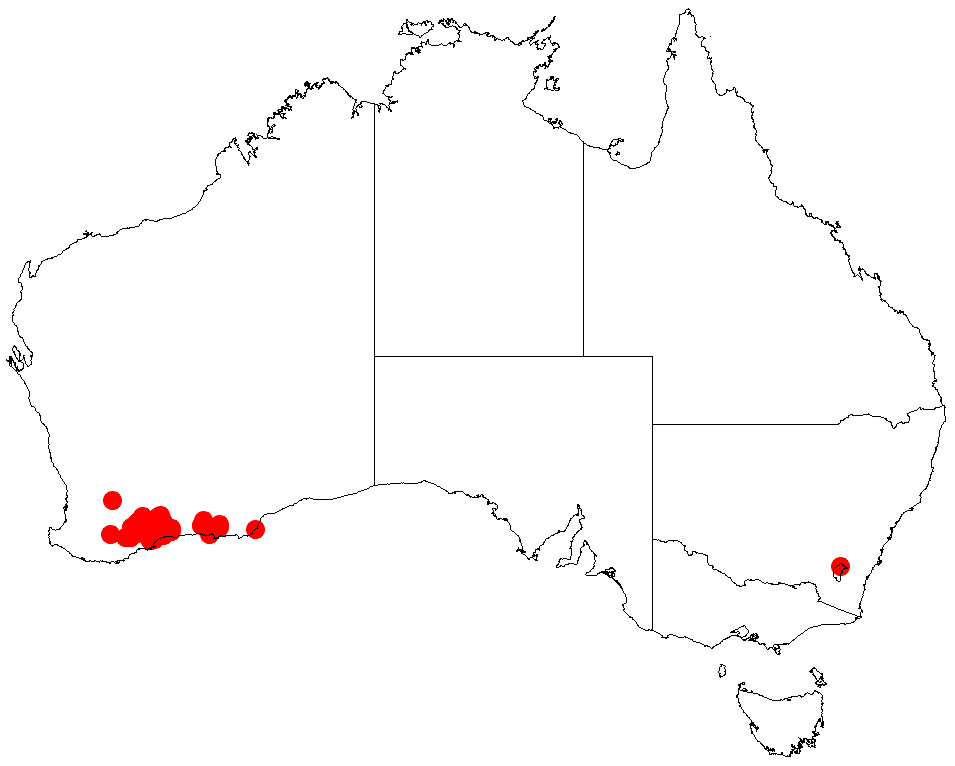
- Occurrence data from AVH

= Acacia redolens =

Species of legume

Acacia redolens, commonly known as bank catclaw, prostrate acacia, or desert carpet, is a shrub belonging to the genus Acacia and the subgenus Plurinerves.

== Description ==
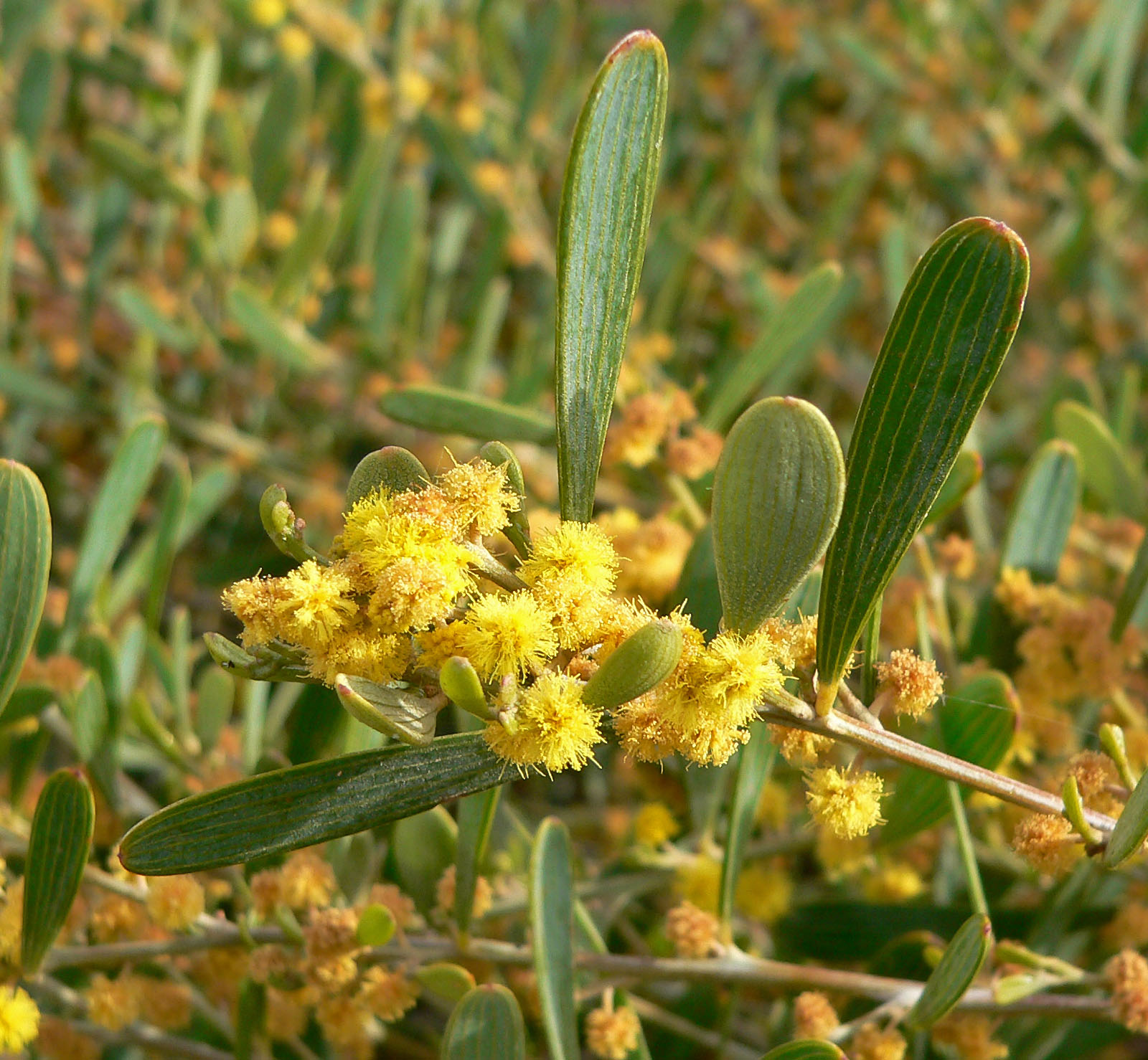
Flowers close up

It is a dense, small to medium-sized shrub that usually reaches heights of 0.5 to 3, rarely up to 5 or even 7 meters. Vegetative parts of the plant and especially the yellow flowers give off an intense vanilla scent. The spreading fragrant shrub typically grows to a height of 0.5 to 3 metres (2 to 10 ft).

It blooms from August to October in its native range, and produces yellow flowers. The small flowers, whose optical effect is based on the yellow stamens, are located in the leaf axils. The brownish legumes are about 25 millimeters long and about 6 millimeters wide.

In California, it blooms from February through May (late winter to late spring). It is commonly planted by freeways and is found throughout Southern California and some parts of the Bay Area.

== Phylogeny ==
According to the Catalogue of Life, Acacia contains 1067 species. A 2014 phylogenetic study of Acacia in Australia suggests the following phylogenetic relationships:

- - A. cyclops A.Cunn. ex G.Don — coastal wattle
  - A. stenophylla A.Cunn. ex Benth. — shoestring acacia
- - A. brachyclada W.Fitzg.
  - - A. redolens Maslin — bank catclaw
    - - - A. georginae F.M.Bailey — georgina gidyea
        - - A. argyrodendron Domin — black gidyea
          - A. harpophylla F.Muell. ex Benth. — brigalow
      - - A. sclerophylla Lindl. — hard-leaf wattle
        - - - - - - A. loderi Maiden — nelia
                  - - A. maconochieana Pedley — Mullan wattle
                    - A. tephrina Pedley — boree
                - - A. pendula A.Cunn. ex G.Don — true myall
                  - - A. cana Maiden — cabbage tree wattle
                    - - A. latzii Maslin — Tjilpi wattle
                      - A. sibilans Maslin — whispering myall
              - - A. melvillei Pedley — yarran
                - A. homalophylla A.Cunn. ex Benth. — yarran
            - - A. maranoensis Pedley — womel
              - A. microsperma Pedley — bowyakka
          - - - A. amyctica R.S.Cowan & Maslin
              - A. ancistrophylla C.R.P.Andrews
            - - A. enervia Maiden & Blakely
              - A. papyrocarpa Benth. — western myall

== Distribution ==
It is native to an area along the southern coast in the Great Southern and Goldfields-Esperance regions of Western Australia. The plant is considered an invasive weed in areas of California where it was used as a fast growing groundcover along freeways. It is particularly problematic in the San Gabriel Valley and Mission Valley.

Acacia redolens thrives on salty or alkaline loamy, clayey, clayey-loamy or sandy soils and can be used as a groundcover. It occurs on the edges of salt lakes or in salty depressions and can withstand frost down to −7 °C.

== See also ==
- Media related to Acacia redolens at Wikimedia Commons
- Data related to Acacia redolens at Wikispecies
- List of Acacia species

=== External links ===
- Atlas of Living Australia
- CalFlora
- Encyclopedia of Life
- FloraBase
- Global Biodiversity Information Facility
- iNaturalist
- Invasive.Org
- Jepson eFlora
- PlantNet
- USDA National Resources Conservation Service
- Useful Temperate Plants
- World Wide Wattle
