= Hard-leaf wattle =

Hard-leaf wattle is a common name for several plants and may refer to:

- Acacia sclerophylla, endemic to southern Australia
- Acacia spinescens
