= Acacia pelophila =

Conservation status
- Priority One — Poorly Known Taxa (DEC)

Scientific classification
- Kingdom: Plantae
- Clade: Tracheophytes
- Clade: Angiosperms
- Clade: Eudicots
- Clade: Rosids
- Order: Fabales
- Family: Fabaceae
- Subfamily: Caesalpinioideae
- Clade: Mimosoid clade
- Genus: Acacia
- Species: A. pelophila

Binomial name
- Acacia pelophila R.S.Cowan & Maslin

Species of legume

Acacia pelophila is a shrub of the genus Acacia and the subgenus Plurinerves that is endemic to a small area along the west coast of western Australia.

== Description ==
The dense spreading shrub typically grows to a height of 0.9 to 2 metres (3 to 7 ft) and has a rounded to spreading habit. It has resinous new growth and angled, glabrous and cylindrical branchlets. Like most species of Acacia it has phyllodes rather than true leaves. The evergreen, glabrous and leathery phyllodes are ascending to erect and have a linear-oblanceolate shape and are straight to slightly incurved. The phyllodes have a length of 3.5 to 7.5 cm (1.4 to 3.0 in) and a width of 3 to 6 mm (0.12 to 0.24 in) and have six to ten impressed and distant nerves on each face. It blooms from July to September and produces yellow flowers. The simple inflorescences occur in pairs located in the axils and have spherical to obloid shaped flower-heads with a length of 5.5 to 6 mm (0.22 to 0.24 in) and a diameter of about 4.5 mm (0.18 in) containing 33 to 45 golden coloured flowers. The firmly chartaceous to thinly leathery seed pods that form after flowering have a linear to string of bead shape and are straight to shallowly curved. The hairy and resinous pods have a length of up to about 5 cm (2.0 in) and a width of around 1.5 mm (0.059 in). The black semi-glossy seeds inside have an oblong-elliptic shape and a length of about 3 mm (0.12 in) with an apical aril.

== Taxonomy ==
The species was first formally described by the botanists Richard Sumner Cowan and Bruce Maslin as a part of the work Acacia miscellany. Miscellaneous new taxa and lectotypifications in Western Australian Acacia, mostly section Plurinerves (Leguminosae: Mimosoideae) as published in the journal Nuytsia. It was reclassified by Leslie Pedley in 2003 as Racosperma pelophilum then transferred back to genus Acacia in 2006. It is quite closely related to Acacia sclerophylla and less closely to Acacia spongolitica and superficially resembles Acacia lanei.

== Distribution ==
It is native to a small area in the Mid West region of Western Australia where it is often situated along saline creeklines. It has a limited range to the north west of Northampton growing in clay soils as a part of in mixed shrubland communities.

== See also ==
- List of Acacia species
