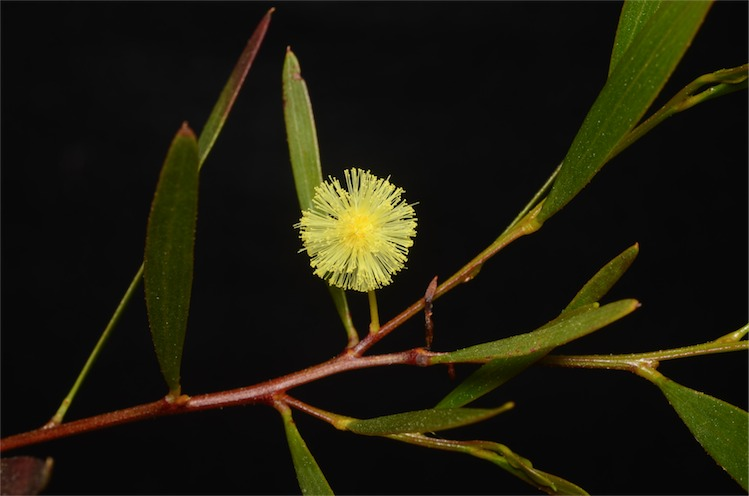
- In the Australian National Botanic Gardens

Scientific classification
- Kingdom: Plantae
- Clade: Embryophytes
- Clade: Tracheophytes
- Clade: Spermatophytes
- Clade: Angiosperms
- Clade: Eudicots
- Clade: Rosids
- Order: Fabales
- Family: Fabaceae
- Subfamily: Caesalpinioideae
- Clade: Mimosoid clade
- Genus: Acacia
- Species: A. spongolitica

Binomial name
- Acacia spongolitica R.S.Cowan & Maslin
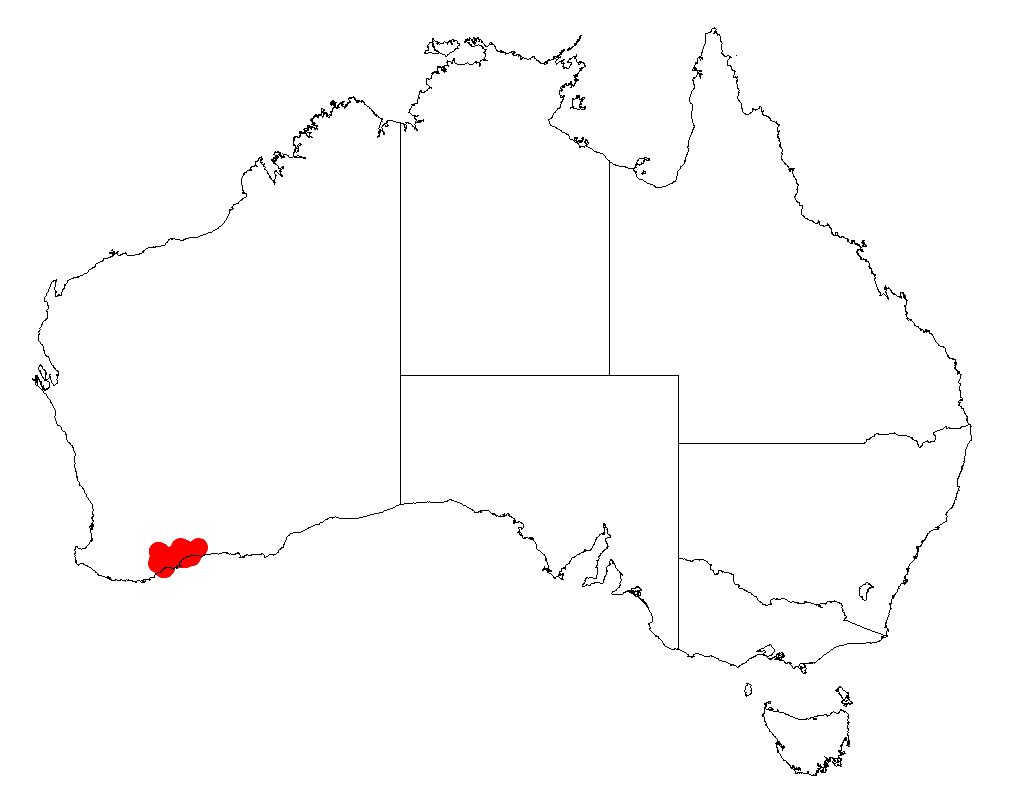
- Occurrence data from AVH

= Acacia spongolitica =

Species of legume

Acacia spongolitica is a shrub of the genus Acacia and the subgenus Plurinerves that is endemic to south western Australia.

== Description ==
The spreading, aromatic and resinous shrub typically grows to a height of 1 to 3 metres (3 to 10 ft) and a width of 1.5 to 4 metres (5 to 13 ft). It blooms from July to September and produces yellow flowers. It has resinous, glabrous and apically angled branchlets . Like most species of Acacia it has phyllodes rather than true leaves. The glabrous, leathery and evergreen phyllodes have a linear to oblong-elliptic shape with a length of 3 to 7 cm (1.2 to 2.8 in) and a width of 4 to 7 mm (0.16 to 0.28 in) with one or two main nerves and several parallel and less prominent secondary nerves.

== Taxonomy ==
The species was first formally described by the botanists Richard Sumner Cowan and Bruce Maslin in 1990 as a part of the work Acacia Miscellany. Some oligoneurous species of Acacia (Leguminosae: Mimosoideae: Section Plurinerves) from Western Australia as published in the journal Nuytsia. It was reclassified in 2003 by Leslie Pedley as Racosperma spongoliticum then transferred back to genus Acacia in 2006. It belongs to the Acacia flavipila group of wattle and is thought to be most closely related to Acacia lanei, Acacia ixiophylla and Acacia veronica also closely resembles Acacia pelophila.

== Discussion ==
It is native to an area in the Great Southern and Goldfields-Esperance regions of Western Australia where it is commonly situated in granite river or creek beds and on spongolite breakaways growing in shallow rocky soils. he range of the plant extend from around Ongerup in the west to near Ravensthorpe in the east and south to the coast around the Beaufort Inlet and Fitzgerald River National Park often as a part of low Eucalyptus woodland communities.

== See also ==
- List of Acacia species
