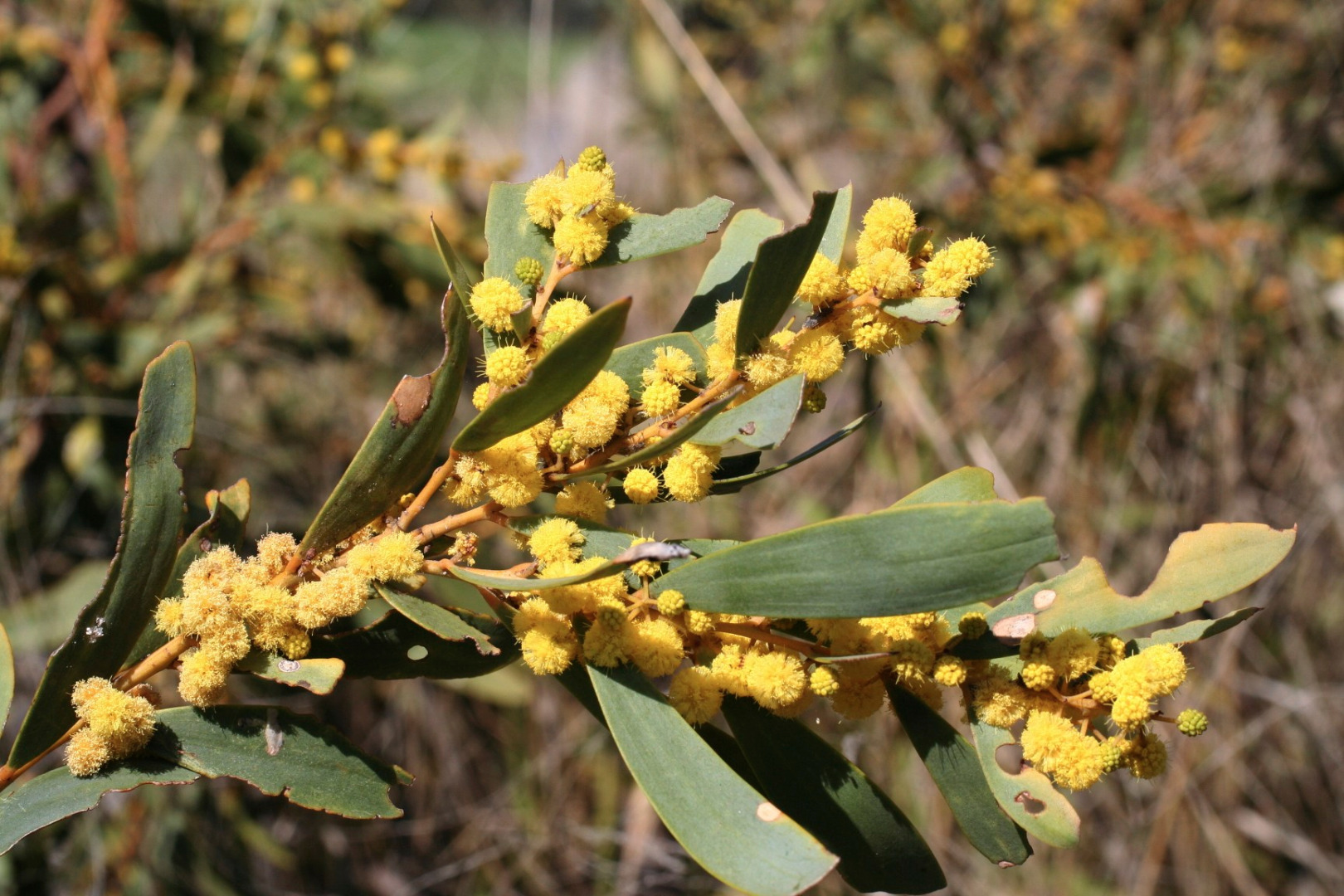

Scientific classification
- Kingdom: Plantae
- Clade: Tracheophytes
- Clade: Angiosperms
- Clade: Eudicots
- Clade: Rosids
- Order: Fabales
- Family: Fabaceae
- Subfamily: Caesalpinioideae
- Clade: Mimosoid clade
- Genus: Acacia
- Species: A. melvillei

Binomial name
- Acacia melvillei Pedley
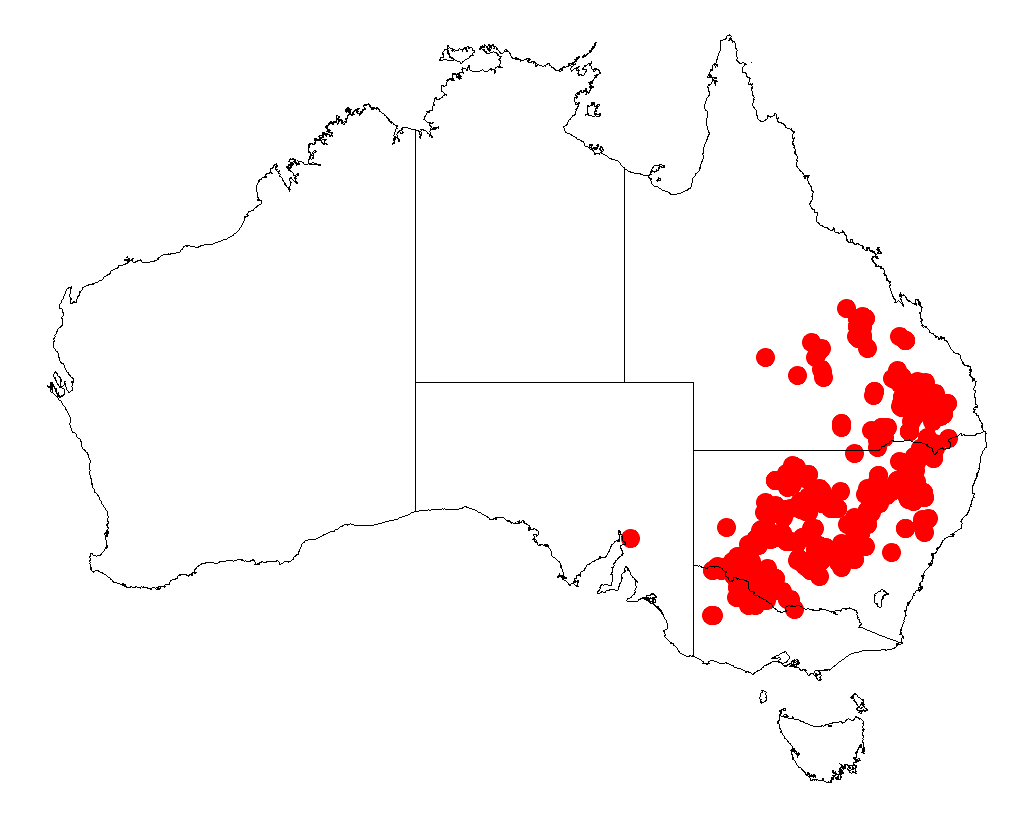
- Occurrence data from AVH

Synonyms
- ? Acacia pendula var. glabrata F.Muell. ex Maiden; Acacia sp. aff. pendula; Racosperma melvillei (Pedley) Pedley

= Acacia melvillei =

Yarran

Species of legume

Acacia melvillei, commonly known as yarran or myall, is a species of flowering plant in the family Fabaceae and is endemic to eastern Australia. It is a tree, usually with glabrous branchlets, narrowly elliptic or oblong phyllodes, spherical heads of golden yellow flowers, and oblong, flat, thinly papery pods.

== Description ==
Acacia melvillei is a tree that typically grows to a height of up to 15 m (49 ft) and has glabrous branchlets. Its phyllodes are ascending, narrowly elliptic or oblong, mostly 50–90 mm (2.0–3.5 in) long, 5–10 mm (0.20–0.39 in) wide, flat and leathery with many closely parallel, obscure veins of which up to three are more prominent that the rest. The flowers are borne in up to five (usually 2) spherical heads in axils on peduncles 4–9 mm (0.16–0.35 in) long, each head 5–8 mm (0.20–0.31 in) in diameter with 25 to 50 golden yellow flowers. Flowering usually occurs from August to October, and the pods are oblong, straight, up to 90 mm (3.5 in) long, 9–15 mm (0.35–0.59 in) wide, glabrous, thinly papery, slightly raised over and irregularly constricted between the seeds. The seeds are broadly elliptic, 3.5–3.5 mm (0.14–0.14 in) long and glossy brownish black with a small aril.

== Taxonomy ==
Acacia melvillei was first formally described in 1978 by Leslie Pedley in the journal Austrobaileya from specimens collected 9 mi (14 km) east-north-east of Springsure in 1961. The specific epithet honours Ronald Melville who was once a botanist at Kew Royal Botanic Gardens. The tree is similar in appearance to Acacia homalophylla and is thought to form hybrids with Acacia loderi.

== Distribution and habitat ==
Yarran occurs in south-eastern Queensland from Clermont to Stanthorpe, across central New South Wales and into Mildura and Kerang in Victoria. It grows in loam, clay and sand, often in open woodland and woodland.

It dominates the endangered Acacia melvillei shrubland in the Riverina and Murray-Darling Depression bioregions in New South Wales where it occurs in pure stands or along with less abundant tall shrubs or trees including Acacia loderi, Alectryon oleifolius, Casuarina pauper and Myoporum platycarpum. The open canopy is followed by a scattered layer of mid-stratum shrubs then by a highly variable but sometimes sparse ground layer of grasses.

== See also ==
- List of Acacia species
