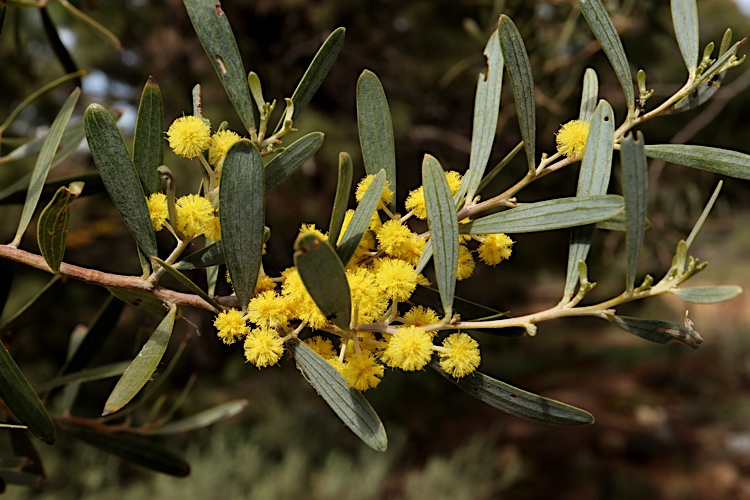
- In the Australian Inland Botanic Gardens

Scientific classification
- Kingdom: Plantae
- Clade: Embryophytes
- Clade: Tracheophytes
- Clade: Spermatophytes
- Clade: Angiosperms
- Clade: Eudicots
- Clade: Rosids
- Order: Fabales
- Family: Fabaceae
- Subfamily: Caesalpinioideae
- Clade: Mimosoid clade
- Genus: Acacia
- Species: A. trineura

Binomial name
- Acacia trineura F.Muell.
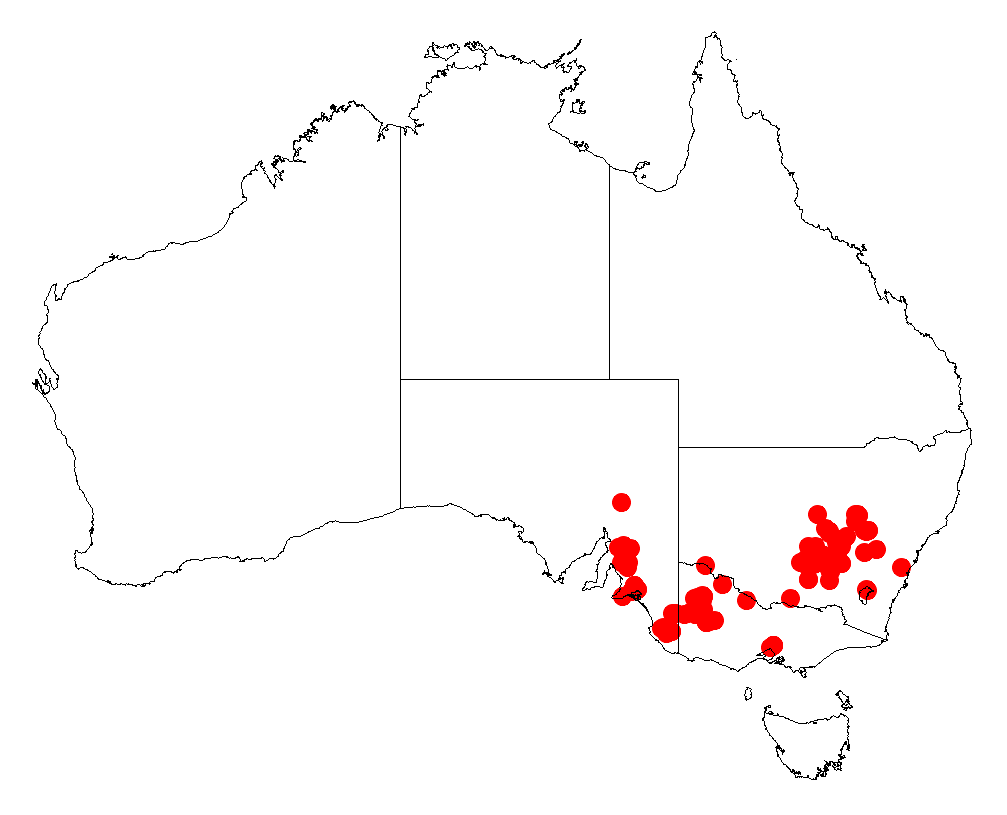
- Occurrence data from AVH

= Acacia trineura =

Species of legume

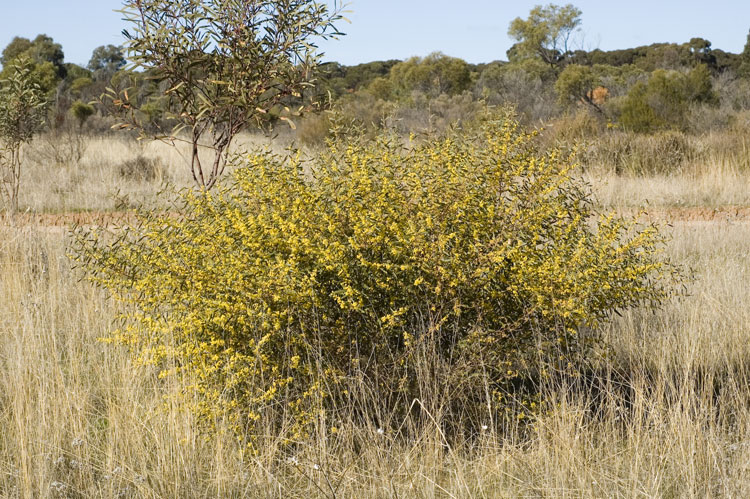
Habit near West Wyalong

Acacia trineura, known colloquially as three-nerve wattle or three nerved wattle or green wattle, is a species of Acacia native to south eastern Australia.

== Description ==
The shrub or small tree typically grows to a height of 1 to 5 m (3 ft 3 in to 16 ft 5 in) and has a rounded habit. The slightly angular and hoary branchlets have resinous ridges and smooth grey bark. Like most species of Acacia it has phyllodes rather than true leaves. The glabrous, thinly leathery and evergreen phyllodes have an obovate to oblanceolate shape with a length of 3 to 7 cm (1.2 to 2.8 in) and a width of 4 to 11 mm (0.16 to 0.43 in) and are straight to shallowly curved with three resinous and distinct main veins that are impressed in crests of low ridges and surrounded by many secondary veins. It blooms between August and October. The inflorescences occur in groups of three to eight on an axillary axis that is 2 to 15 mm (0.079 to 0.591 in) in length. the spherical flower-heads have a diameter of 3 to 5 mm (0.12 to 0.20 in) and contain 12 to 25 pale yellow to yellow coloured flowers. After flowering papery and sparsely haired seed pods form that are straight and more or less flat but raised over and constricted between each of the seeds. The pods are 3 to 8 cm (1.2 to 3.1 in) in length and 2 to 3 mm (0.079 to 0.118 in) wide. The glossy black seeds inside are about 4 mm (0.16 in) in length and have an oblong shape.

== Taxonomy ==
The species was first formally described by the botanist Ferdinand von Mueller in 1863 as a part of the work Fragmenta Phytographiae Australiae. It was reclassified by Leslie Pedley in 2003 as Racosperma trineurum then returned to genus Acacia in 2006. The specific epithet is in reference to the three main veins visible in the phyllodes. It is thought to be quite closely related to Acacia redolens, a species found in Western Australia.

== Distribution ==
It is endemic to south eastern New South Wales, northern Victoria and south eastern South Australia. In New South Wales the range of the plant is mainly between West Wyalong, Condobolin and Forbes where it is usually found growing in red earth soils as a part of mallee communities. In Victoria it is found in the Lowan Mallee, Murray Mallee and Wimmera regions where it found near water sources growing in red earth or clay soils. It is considered to be a vulnerable species in Victoria It is considered to be rare in South Australia and is confined the south eastern part of the state to the south-west of Naracoorte growing in dark coloured but shallow cracking clays.

== See also ==
- List of Acacia species
