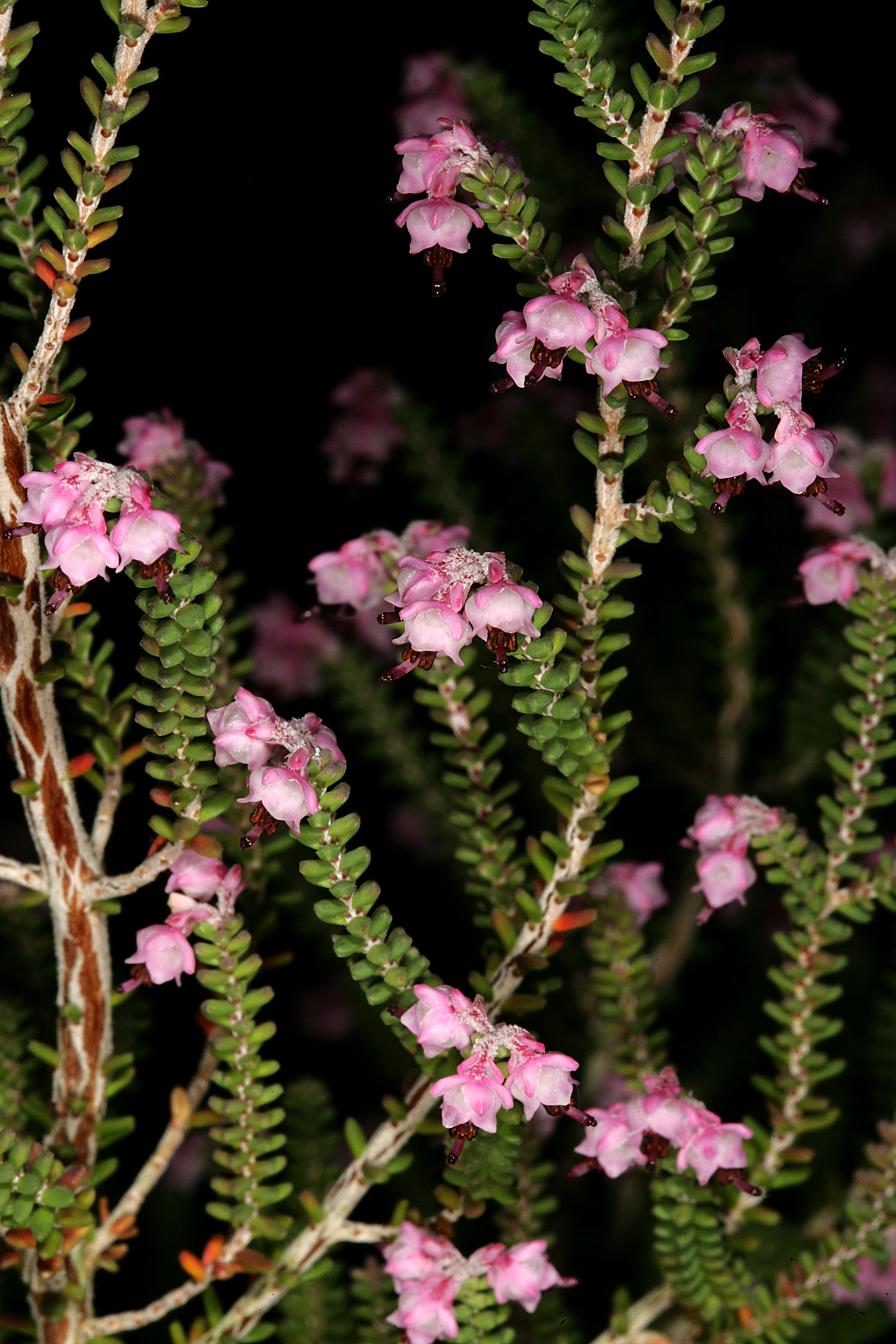

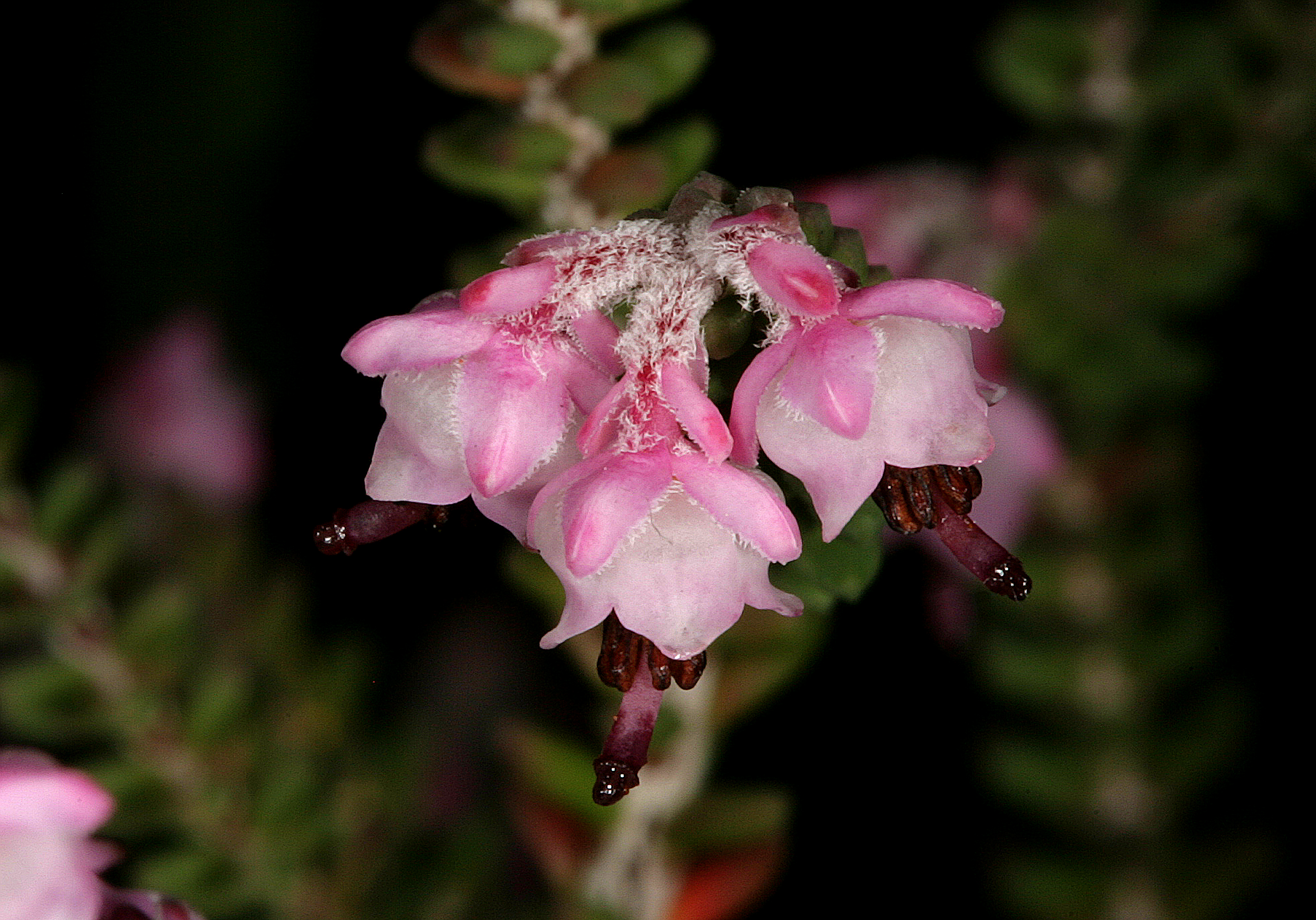

Scientific classification
- Kingdom: Plantae
- Clade: Tracheophytes
- Clade: Angiosperms
- Clade: Eudicots
- Clade: Asterids
- Order: Ericales
- Family: Ericaceae
- Genus: Erica
- Species: E. uysii

Binomial name
- Erica uysii H.A.Baker

= Erica uysii =

Species of flowering plant

Erica uysii is a plant belonging to the genus Erica and is part of the fynbos. The species is endemic to the Western Cape where it occurs in the De Hoop Nature Reserve. Here there is one population of approximately 500 plants that is threatened by the invasive plant, the rooikrans (Acacia cyclops).
