= Acacia veronica =

Veronica's wattle

Conservation status
- Priority Three — Poorly Known Taxa (DEC)

Scientific classification
- Kingdom: Plantae
- Clade: Tracheophytes
- Clade: Angiosperms
- Clade: Eudicots
- Clade: Rosids
- Order: Fabales
- Family: Fabaceae
- Subfamily: Caesalpinioideae
- Clade: Mimosoid clade
- Genus: Acacia
- Species: A. veronica

Binomial name
- Acacia veronica Maslin
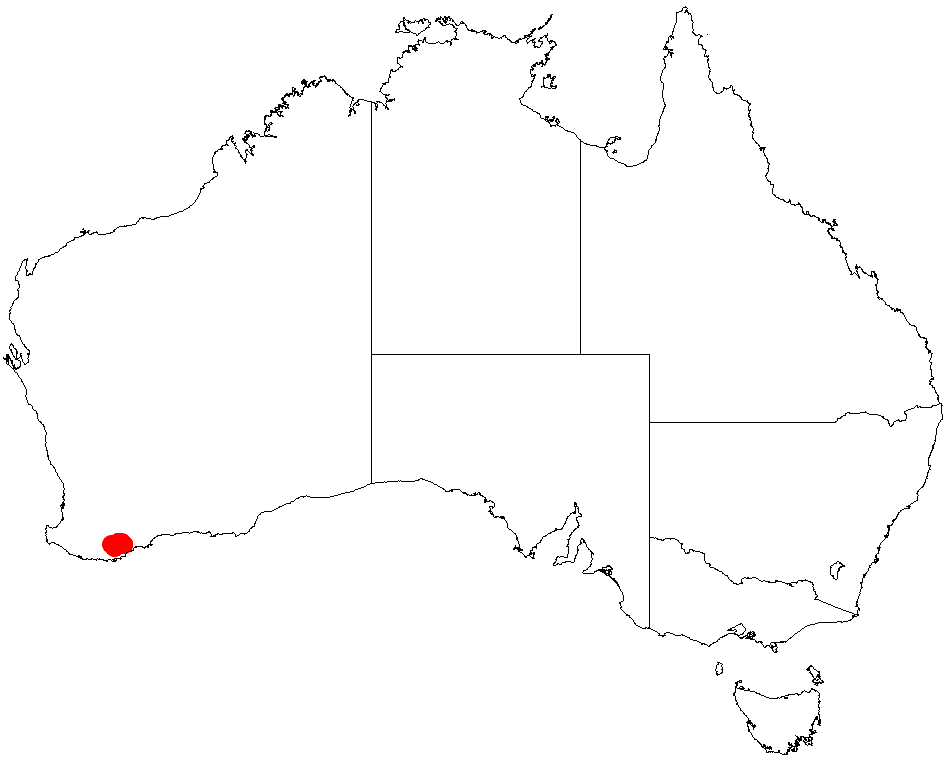
- Occurrence data from AVH

Species of legume

Acacia veronica, commonly known as Veronica's wattle, is a shrub or tree of the genus Acacia and the subgenus Plurinerves that is endemic to a small area of south western Australia.

== Description ==
The shrub or tree typically grows to a height of 1.5 to 10 metres (5 to 33 ft) and has aromatic, glabrous and finely ribbed branchlets resinous when still immature. Like most species of Acacia it has phyllodes rather than true leaves. The thinly leathery and evergreen phyllodes have a linear to linear-elliptic shape and are straight to slightly incurved with a length of 9 to 15 cm (3.5 to 5.9 in) and a width of 3 to 8 mm (0.12 to 0.31 in) and has two to three nerves per face with the central nerve being most prominent. It blooms from March to September and produces white-cream flowers. The inflorescences occur in pairs on racemes with an axis length of 2 to 6 mm (0.079 to 0.236 in) and have spherical flower-heads with a diameter of 7 to 12 mm (0.28 to 0.47 in) containing 24 to 27 white to cream coloured flowers. The thinly leathery to papery seed pods that form after flowering have a linear shape with a length up to 11 cm (4.3 in) and a width of 5 to 6 mm (0.20 to 0.24 in) and contain shiny dark brown seeds with an oblong shape and a length of about 6 mm (0.24 in) with a white aril.

== Taxonomy ==
The species was first formally described by the botanist Bruce Maslin in 1989 as a part of the work Acacia veronica Maslin (Leguminosae: Mimosoideae), a new species of Acacia endemic in the Stirling Range, Western Australia as described in the journal Nuytsia. In 2003 it was reclassified by Leslie Pedley as Racosperma veronicae then transferred back to genus Acacia in 2006. It is thought to be reasonably closely related to Acacia spongolitica but not to other species found in Western Australia, it also appears similar in appearance to Acacia cyclops.

== Distribution ==
It is native to an area in the Great Southern region of Western Australia where it is commonly situated in sheltered sites near summits and in gullies along creeks and streams. The range of the plant is contained within the Stirling Range National Park as a part of Eucalyptus marginata - Corymbia calophylla or Eucalyptus wandoo woodlands or forest communities.

== See also ==
- List of Acacia species
