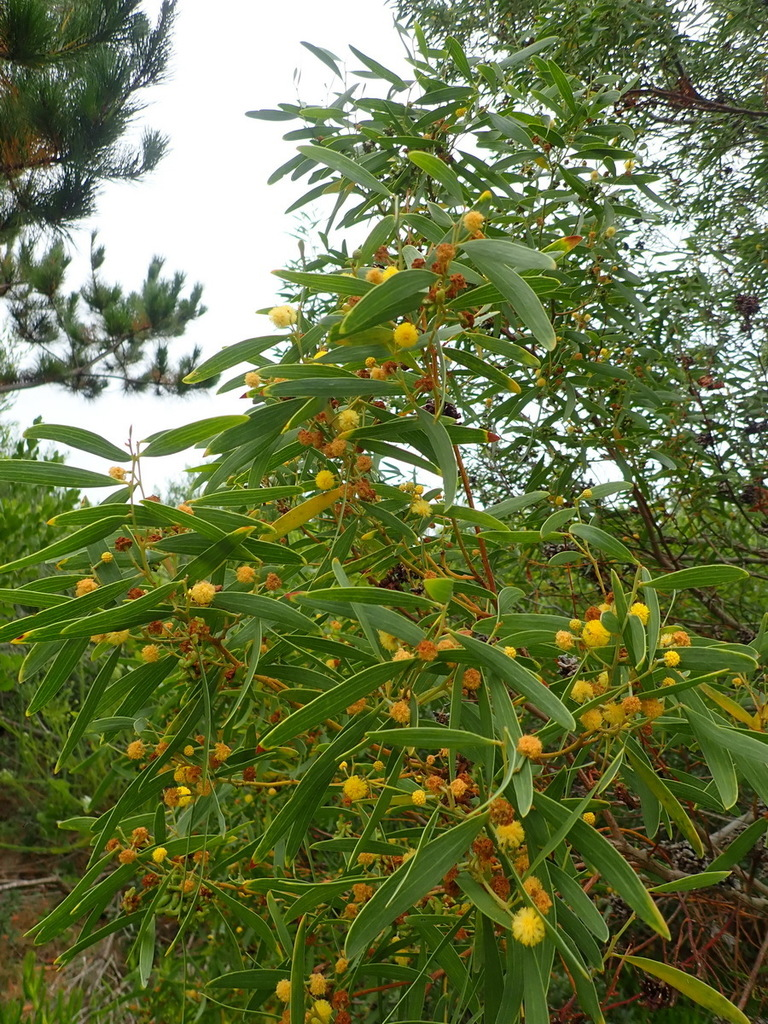

Conservation status
- Least Concern (IUCN 3.1)

Scientific classification
- Kingdom: Plantae
- Clade: Embryophytes
- Clade: Tracheophytes
- Clade: Spermatophytes
- Clade: Angiosperms
- Clade: Eudicots
- Clade: Rosids
- Order: Fabales
- Family: Fabaceae
- Subfamily: Caesalpinioideae
- Clade: Mimosoid clade
- Genus: Acacia
- Species: A. cyclops

Binomial name
- Acacia cyclops A.Cunn. ex G.Don
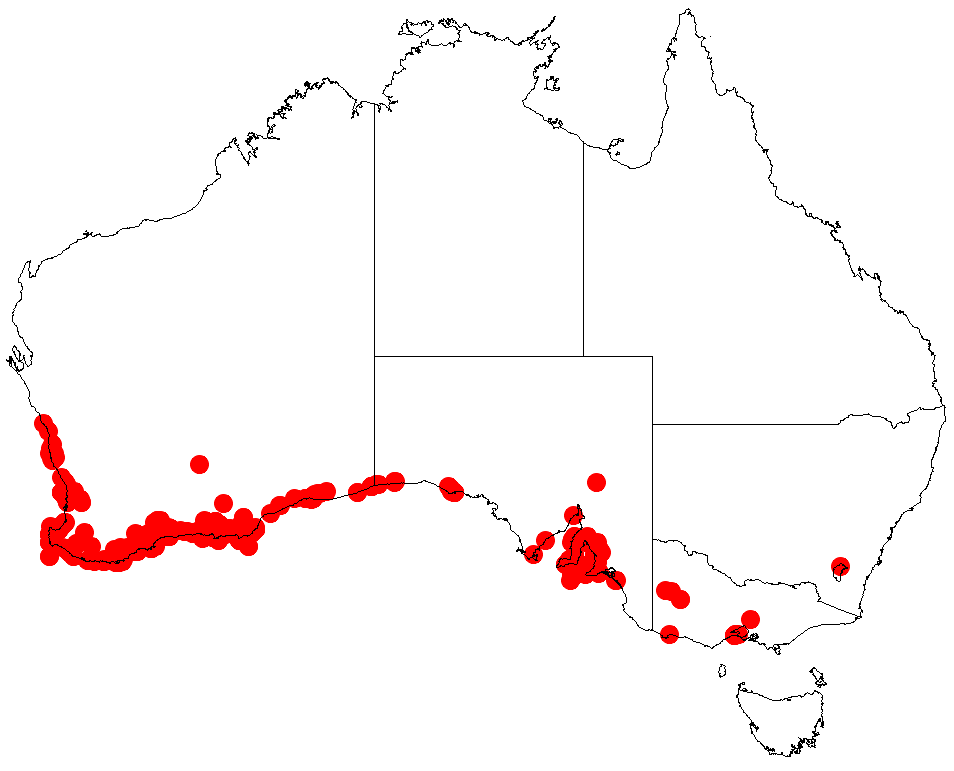
- Occurrence data from AVH

Synonyms
- List: ?Acacia cyclopis Sweet nom. inval., nom. nud.; Acacia cyclopis J.Mackay ex Loudon nom. inval., nom. nud.; Acacia cyclopis F.Muell. orth. var.; ?Acacia eglandulosa DC.; Acacia mirbeli Dehnh. orth. var.; Acacia mirbelii Dehnh.; Racosperma eglandulosum (DC.) Pedley

= Acacia cyclops =

Coastal wattle

Species of plant

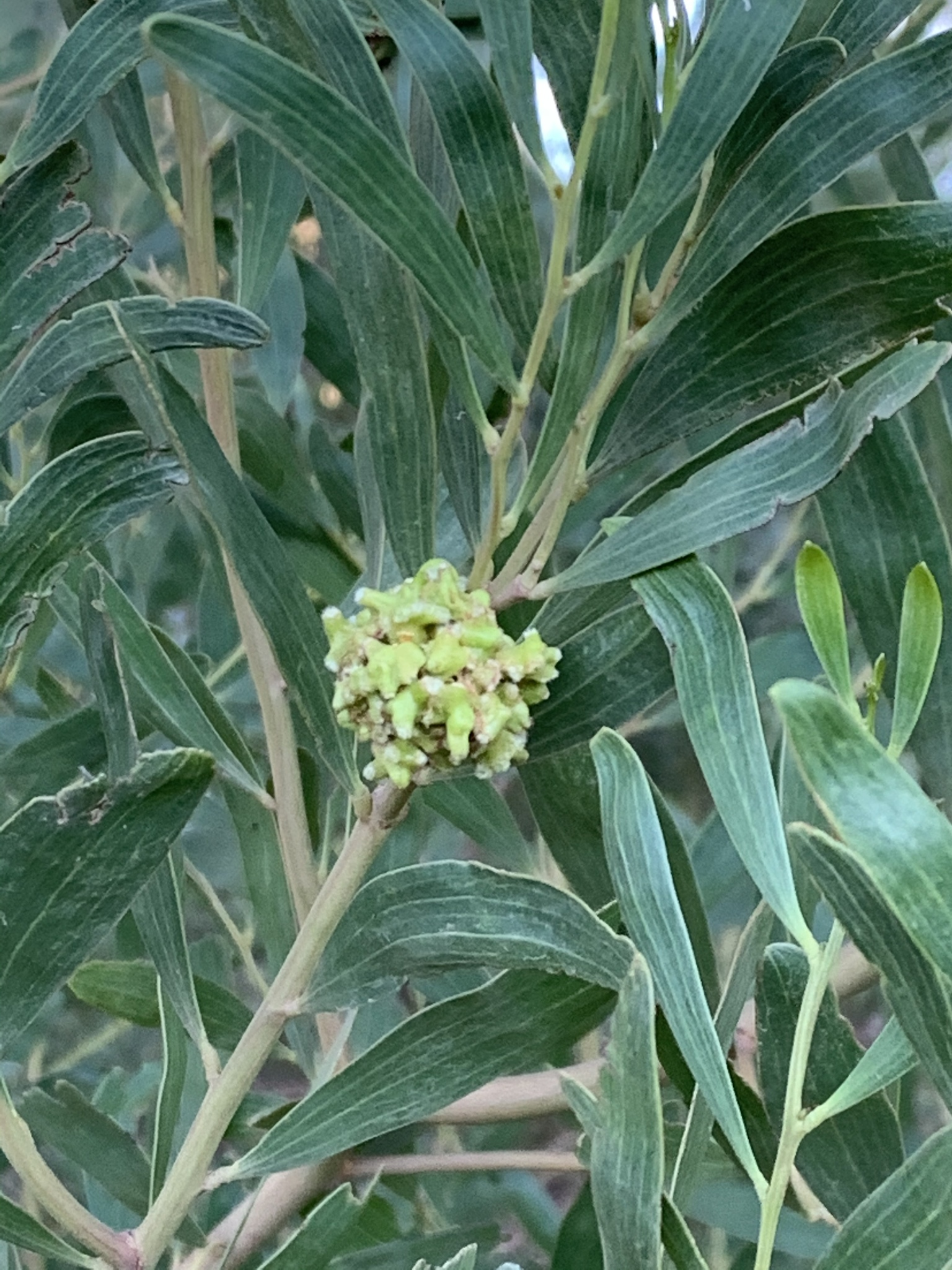
Foliage and flower buds

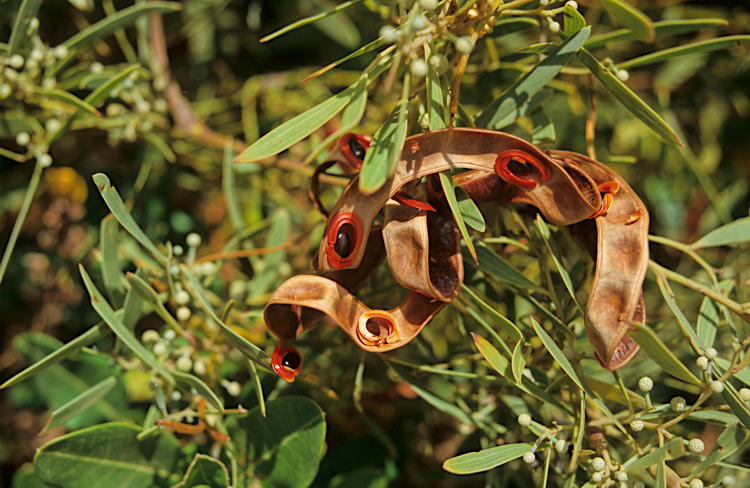
Seed pods

Acacia cyclops, commonly known as coastal wattle, cyclops wattle, one-eyed wattle, red-eyed wattle, redwreath acacia, western coastal wattle, and as rooikrans or rooikrans acacia in South Africa, is a species of flowering plant in the family Fabaceae. The Noongar peoples of Western Australia know the plant as wilyawa or woolya wah. It is a dense shrub or tree with narrowly oblong to elliptic phyllodes, spherical heads of golden yellow flowers, and linear, leathery pods with colourful seeds. The species is native to Australia, and is distributed along the west coast of Western Australia as far north as Leeman, and along the south coast into South Australia. It has been introduced to several other countries.

== Description ==
Acacia cyclops is a shrub or small tree that typically grows to a height of 1–6 m (3 ft 3 in – 19 ft 8 in) and has glabrous branchlets. Its phyllodes are ascending, narrowly oblong to elliptic or egg-shaped with the narrower end toward the base, mostly 40–95 mm (1.6–3.7 in) long and 6–15 mm (0.24–0.59 in) wide, leathery and glabrous with three or four main veins. The flowers are borne in two spherical heads in axils on peduncles 4–12 mm (0.16–0.47 in) long, each head 5–7 mm (0.20–0.28 in) in diameter often with 60 to 75 golden yellow flowers. Flowering occurs from September to May, and the pods are linear, up to 150 mm (5.9 in) long and 7–16 mm (0.28–0.63 in) wide, thickly leathery and glabrous. The seeds are elliptic, 5–7 mm (0.20–0.28 in) long, glossy dark brown to black, with an orange to scarlet attachment encircling the seed.

== Taxonomy ==
Acacia cyclops was first formally described by the botanist George Don in 1832 in his book A General History of Dichlamydeous Plants. The specific epithet (cyclops) may be an allusion to Cyclops in Homer's Odyssey of Odysseus who gouged out the eye of Polyphemus with a burnt stake, because the seeds are black with a bright red attachment to the ovule.

This wattle may be related to Acacia redolens and is quite similar to Acacia veronica. It is about as drought tolerant as Acacia saligna but is also able to tolerate sea spray.

== Distribution and habitat ==
Coastal wattle is widespread and apparently discontinuous in coastal and near-coastal areas mainly between Denmark and Israelite Bay and from Leemann to Yorketown and the Yorke Peninsula in South Australia. It grows in coastal heath or scrubland on coastal sand dunes and on limestone.

Acacia cyclops has invaded similar habitats in other areas within Australia, mostly semi-arid regions of inland south-eastern South Australia where it is considered a problem. It is also found in parts of South Africa along roadsides and waterways as well as in parts of California in wetland habitats and among riparian communities. It has been introduced to the Azores, California, the Canary Islands, the Cape Provinces, Cyprus, Ethiopia, Morocco, Namibia, Northern Provinces, Palestine, Portugal, Sicily, Spain and Saint Helena.

In South Africa it is considered to be one of the most widespread alien invasive species, though the roots are susceptible to attack by various species of Ganoderma fungi. A. cyclops is problematic in coastal and lowland parts of the Cape Provinces. The species was introduced in the 1830s where it was used as a dune stabiliser and by 1975 it occupied around 300,000 ha (740,000 acres) of coastal lowlands, and sandy river valleys of inland areas forming dense thickets.

== Uses ==
Indigenous Australians grind the seeds into a flour to make damper, the seeds are a good source of carbohydrates, fats and protein. The seeds pods are also crushed while still green to make an insect repellent and sunscreen that is also used to treat eczema. The pods can also be used to make a soap solution. The edible gum exuded from the trunk can be used as chewing gum or to make a glue. The wood is used to make a variety of tools and the rotten wood is a good source of witchetty grubs.

Red-eyed wattle can also be used to help stabilise coastal sands. It was introduced into Africa for this purpose, but it has spread rapidly and is now a serious pest in southern Africa, where it is known as rooikrans (in Afrikaans, "red garland"). The introduction of the gall-forming cecidomyiid Dasineura dielsi as a biological control has had only limited success in the effective control of the species in these areas.

The green seed pods may be used as a natural soap, by crushing them and using the pods with water to wash with.

== See also ==
- List of Acacia species
- Invasive plants of Australian origin
