= Acacia ancistrophylla =

Scientific classification
- Kingdom: Plantae
- Clade: Tracheophytes
- Clade: Angiosperms
- Clade: Eudicots
- Clade: Rosids
- Order: Fabales
- Family: Fabaceae
- Subfamily: Caesalpinioideae
- Clade: Mimosoid clade
- Genus: Acacia
- Species: A. ancistrophylla

Binomial name
- Acacia ancistrophylla C.R.P.Andrews
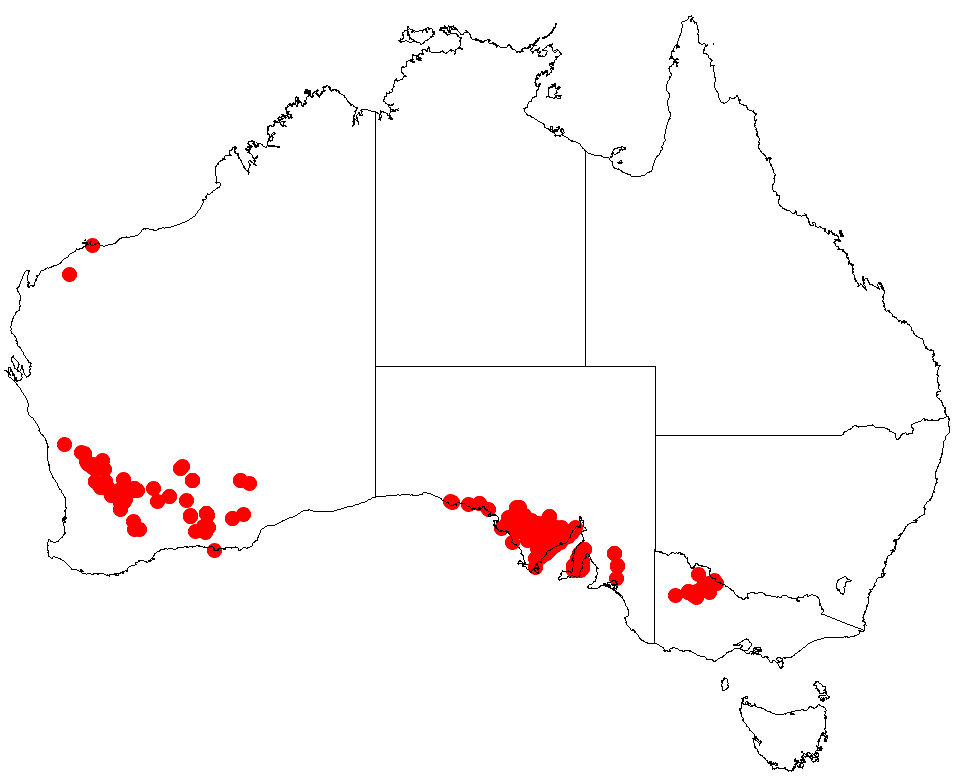
- Occurrence data from AVH

Synonyms
- Racosperma ancistrophyllum (C.R.P.Andrews) Pedley

Species of legume

Habit south of Wubin

Acacia ancistrophylla is a species of flowering plant in the family Fabaceae and is endemic to southern Australia. It is a dense, rounded shrub, with lance-shaped phyllodes with the narrower end towards the base, spherical heads of yellow flowers, and linear pods up to 40 mm (1.6 in) long.

== Description ==
Acacia ancistrophylla is a dense, rounded shrub that typically grows up to 0.4–2.5 m (1 ft 4 in – 8 ft 2 in) high and 3–6 m (9.8–19.7 ft) wide and has grey bark and glabrous or sparsely hairy branchlets. The phyllodes are lance-shaped or narrowly lance-shaped with the narrower end towards the base, 12–48 mm (0.47–1.89 in) long, 1.5–5 mm (0.059–0.197 in) wide and leathery, with many closely parallel veins. The flowers are arranged in two spherical heads in axils, 6–7 mm (0.24–0.28 in) in diameter, on peduncles 1.5–5.5 mm (0.059–0.217 in) long. Each head has 11 to 23 mid- to dark-golden yellow flowers. Flowering time depends on subspecies, and the pods are linear, up to 40 mm (1.6 in) long and 2.5–3.0 mm (0.098–0.118 in) wide and papery to thinly leathery. The seeds are dull tan or dark brown 3.0–3.5 mm (0.12–0.14 in) long and 1.0–2.2 mm (0.039–0.087 in) wide.

== Taxonomy ==
Acacia ancistrophylla was first formally described in 1904 by the botanist Cecil Andrews in the Journal of the West Australian Natural History Society from specimens he collected near Dundas in 1903. The specific epithet (ancistrophylla) means 'leaves barbed with small hooks'.

In 1995, Richard Sumner Cowan and Bruce Maslin described 3 varieties of A. ancistrophylla and the names are accepted by the Australian Plant Census:

- Acacia ancistrophylla C.R.P.Andrews var. ancistrophylla, flowers in August and September.
- Acacia ancistrophylla var. lissophylla (J.M.Black) R.S.Cowan & Maslin (previously known as Acacia sclerophylla var. lissophylla) flowers from August to October.
- Acacia ancistrophylla var. perarcuata R.S.Cowan & Maslin flowers in August and September.

Cowan and Maslin described the differences among the three varieties as "subtle and difficult to express".

== Distribution ==
Variety ancistrophylla is common to very common in woodland and mallee communities on flats, hillsides and ridges between Wubin, Newdegate and Cundeelee and near Salmon Gums. Variety lissophylla is known from three collections in Western Australia, in scattered locations from Ceduna to Pine Point in South Australia, and in scattered places between Lake Hindmarsh and Swan Hill in Victoria. Variety perarcuata grows in low woodland within a radius of 50–70 km (31–43 mi) of Merredin in Western Australia.

== Conservation status ==
Acacia ancistrophylla var. ancistrophylla is also listed as "not threatened", but var. lissophylla is listed as "Priority Two", meaning that is poorly known and from one or a few locations, and var. perarcuata as "Priority Three" by the Government of Western Australia Department of Biodiversity, Conservation and Attractions. Variety lissophylla is listed as "endangered" under the Victorian Government Flora and Fauna Guarantee Act.

== See also ==
- List of Acacia species
