= Acacia loderi =

- Near the Barrier Highway, between Wilcannia and Cobar

Scientific classification
- Kingdom: Plantae
- Clade: Tracheophytes
- Clade: Angiosperms
- Clade: Eudicots
- Clade: Rosids
- Order: Fabales
- Family: Fabaceae
- Subfamily: Caesalpinioideae
- Clade: Mimosoid clade
- Genus: Acacia
- Species: A. loderi

Binomial name
- Acacia loderi Maiden
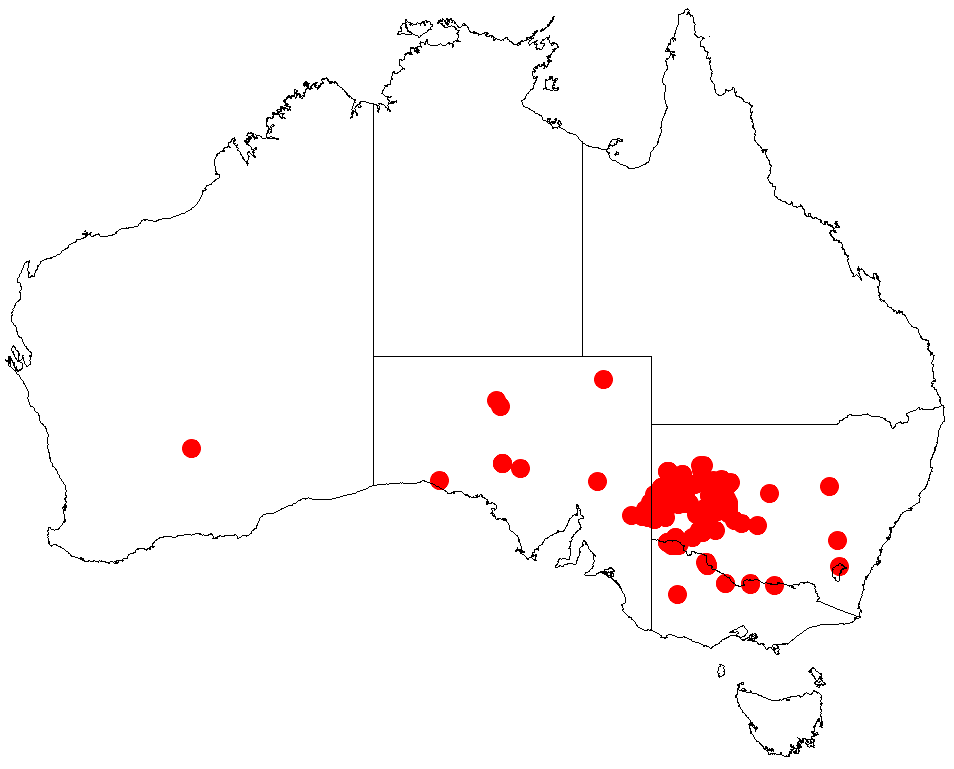
- Occurrence data from AVH

Synonyms
- Acacia sp. aff. sowdenii; Racosperma loderi (Maiden) Pedley

Species of plant

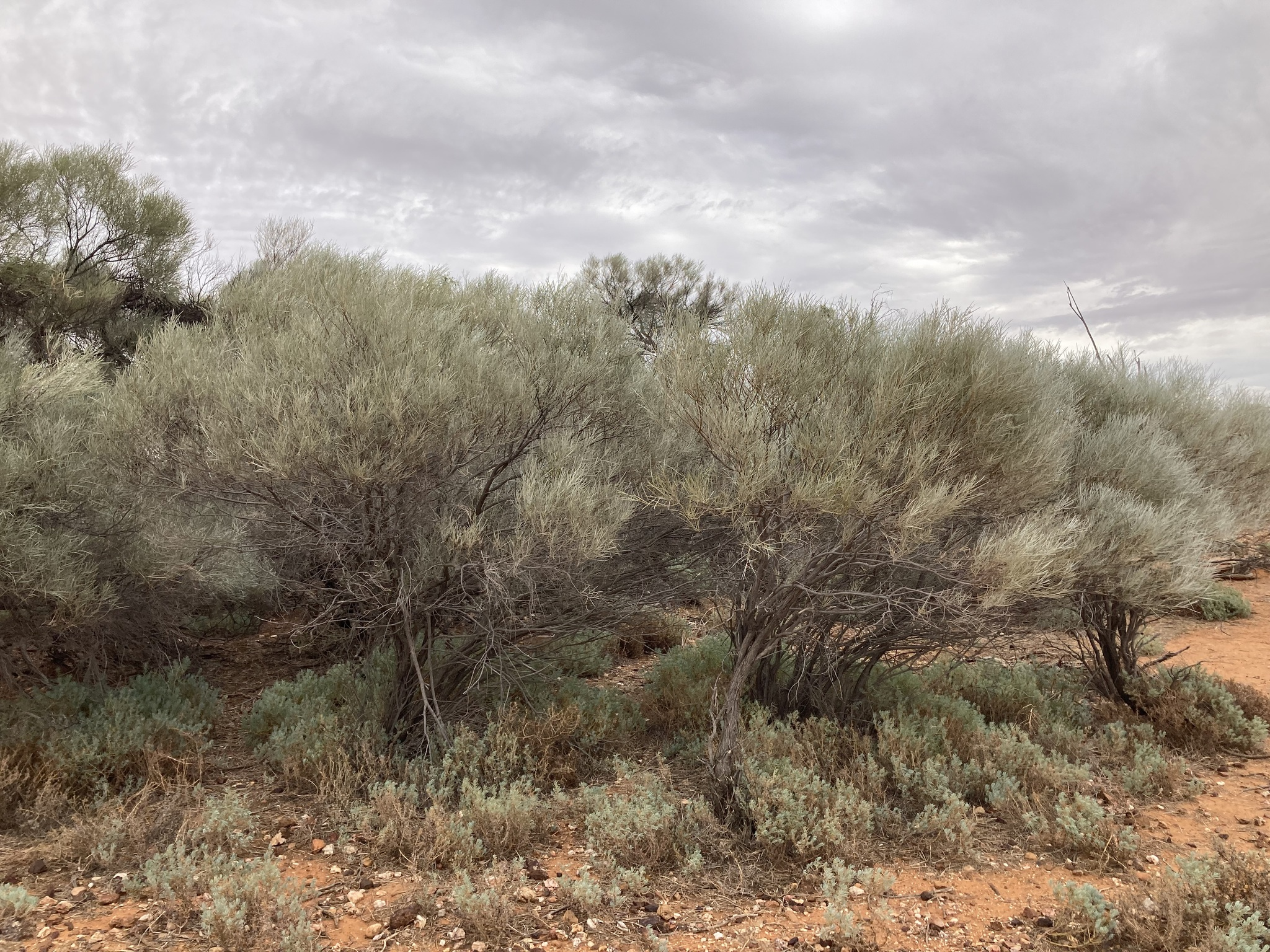
Habit near Fowlers Gap Arid Zone Research Station

Acacia loderi, commonly known as nealie, nelia, Broken Hill gidgee or myall, is a species of flowering plant in the family Fabaceae and is endemic to the south-east of mainland Australia. It is a tall shrub or small tree with sometimes pendulous branchlets, linear, more or less terete to flat phyllodes, spherical heads of golden yellow flowers and papery pods, appearing somewhat like a string of beads.

== Description ==
Acacia loderi is a large shrub or small tree that typically grows to 3–7 m (9.8–23.0 ft) high with greyish bark and branchlets with soft hairs pressed against the surface at first, later glabrous. Its phyllodes are linear, more or less terete to flat, 50–110 mm (2.0–4.3 in) long, 0.9–2 mm (0.035–0.079 in) wide with a fine point on the end, covered with soft hairs and with many closely parallel, indistinct veins. The flowers are borne on spherical heads in two– to six–headed racemes or singly in axils, on peduncles 4–7 mm (0.16–0.28 in) long. Each head is 4–5 mm (0.16–0.20 in) in diameter with 25 to 36 golden yellow flowers. Flowering occurs from August to October, and the pods are papery and smooth, somewhat resembling a string of beads, up to 100 mm (3.9 in) long and 3–5 mm (0.12–0.20 in) wide. The seeds are elliptic, about 4.5 mm (0.18 in) long and glossy brownish black with a small aril.

== Taxonomy ==
Acacia loderi was first formally described in 1920 by Joseph Maiden in the Journal and Proceedings of the Royal Society of New South Wales from specimens collected at Yancowinnie in the Broken Hill district by Andrew Charles Loder, assistant forester at Broken Hill. The specific epithet (loderi) honours the collector of the type specimens. The common name nelia and its former variants nealie and neelya are derived from the Ngiyambaa word nhiil'i for the species.

== Distribution and habitat ==
Nealie is found in inland mainland southeastern Australia, mainly in far western New South Wales, from west of Hillston and north to White Cliffs, extending into Oakbank Station and Netley Gap in South Australia and near Merbein and Nathalia in Victoria. It grows in colonized brown or red soils in mostly flat country, and forms a dominant component of Acacia loderi shrubland, where it is found with such trees as black oak (Casuarina pauper), inland rosewood (Alectryon oleifolius) and leopardwood (Flindersia maculosa), and an understory of chenopods and grasses. Acacia loderi shrubland has been classified as an 'Endangered Ecological Community' by the New South Wales Government. Key threats include clearing and excessive grazing by livestock.

== Uses ==
The Wiradjuri people of New South Wales use the seeds of the species to make flour for bread, the fibrous bark for making string and rope, and the resin is eaten and can be used to make glue.
