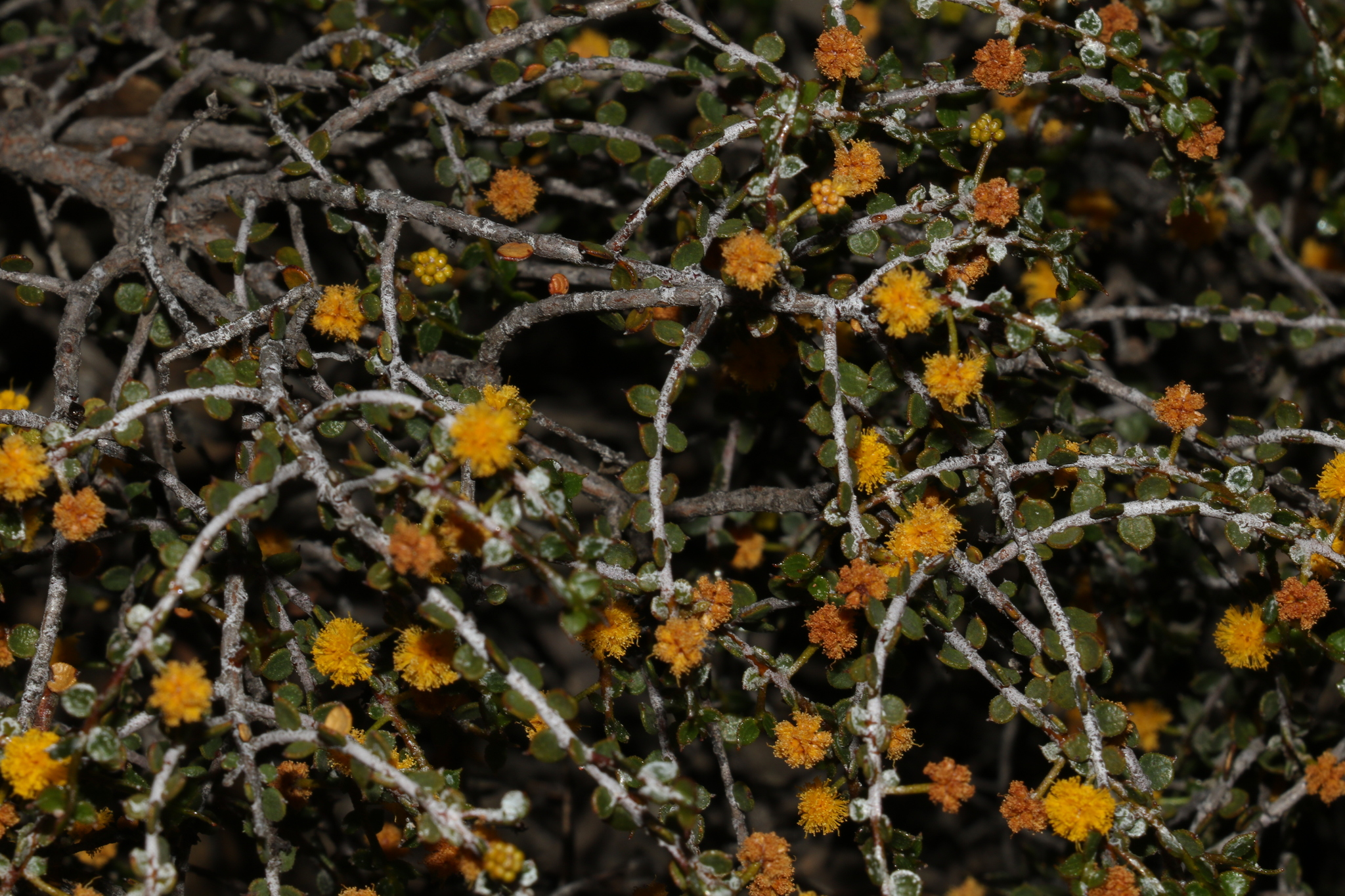
- Near Pingrup

Scientific classification
- Kingdom: Plantae
- Clade: Tracheophytes
- Clade: Angiosperms
- Clade: Eudicots
- Clade: Rosids
- Order: Fabales
- Family: Fabaceae
- Subfamily: Caesalpinioideae
- Clade: Mimosoid clade
- Genus: Acacia
- Species: A. brachyclada

Binomial name
- Acacia brachyclada W.Fitzg.
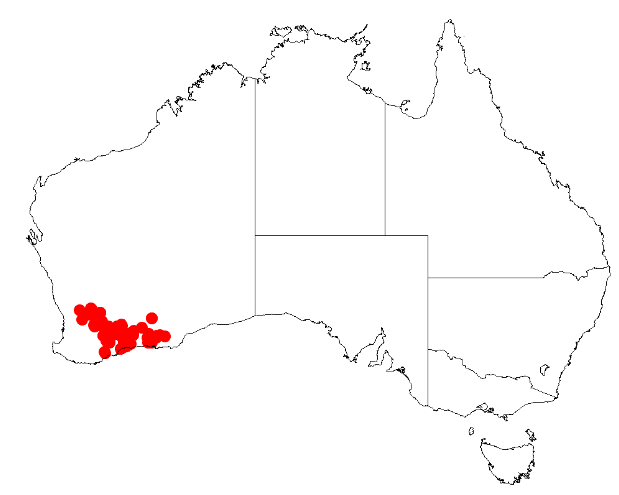
- Acacia brachyclada occurrence data from Australasian Virtual Herbarium

Synonyms
- Racosperma brachycladum (W.Fitzg.) Pedley

= Acacia brachyclada =

Species of legume

Acacia brachyclada is a species of flowering plant in the family Fabaceae and is endemic to the south-west of Western Australia. It is a dense, rounded to spreading, sticky shrub with egg-shaped to elliptic or oblong phyllodes, spherical heads of golden-yellow flowers, and coiled, firmly papery pods somewhat like a string of beads.

== Description ==
Acacia brachyclada is a dense, rounded to spreading or low-domed, sticky shrub that typically grows to a height of 20–50 cm (7.9–19.7 in), and sometimes has arching branches. The phyllodes are egg-shaped to elliptic or oblong, 2–7 mm (0.079–0.276 in) long and 2–4 mm (0.079–0.157 in) wide with a point on the end. The flowers are borne in spherical heads in axils on a peduncle 3–6 mm (0.12–0.24 in) long, the heads with 12 to 16 golden-yellow flowers. Flowering occurs from August to February, and the pods are coiled, firmly papery, glabrous, somewhat like a string of beads, 2.5–4.5 mm (0.098–0.177 in) long with inflated oblong seeds 3–4 mm (0.12–0.16 in) long.

== Taxonomy ==
Acacia brachyclada was first formally described in 1912 by the botanist William Vincent Fitzgerald in the Journal of Botany, British and Foreign from specimens collected near Kellerberrin. The specific epithet (brachyclada) means 'short shoot or branch'.

== Distribution and habitat ==
This species of wattle has a scattered distribution between Kununoppin, Ravenshorpe and Mount Ridley north of Esperance in the Avon Wheatbelt, Coolgardie, Esperance Plains and Mallee bioregions of south-western Western Australia. It is mostly found on gentle undulating plains and low lying areas where grows in clay, loam, sandy or calcareous soils in mallee scrub or woodland.

== Conservation status ==
Acacia brachyclada is listed as "not threatened" by the Government of Western Australia Department of Biodiversity, Conservation and Attractions.

== See also ==
- List of Acacia species
