= Acacia amyctica =

Conservation status
- Priority Two — Poorly Known Taxa (DEC)

Scientific classification
- Kingdom: Plantae
- Clade: Tracheophytes
- Clade: Angiosperms
- Clade: Eudicots
- Clade: Rosids
- Order: Fabales
- Family: Fabaceae
- Subfamily: Caesalpinioideae
- Clade: Mimosoid clade
- Genus: Acacia
- Species: A. amyctica

Binomial name
- Acacia amyctica R.S.Cowan & Maslin

Species of plant endemic to Western Australia

Acacia amyctica is a species of flowering plant in the family Fabaceae and is endemic to the south-west of Western Australia. It is an erect, bushy shrub with ascending to erect, narrowly lance-shaped, sharply-pointed phyllodes with the narrower end towards the base, spherical heads of 18 to 25 golden flowers, and linear to strongly curved pods.

== Description ==
Acacia amyctica is an erect, bushy, cone-shaped shrub with the narrower end towards the base and that typically grows to a height of 0.7–1 m (2 ft 4 in – 3 ft 3 in). It has smooth, light-grey coloured bark and slightly ribbed, sparsely hairy branchlets. Its phyllodes are ascending to erect, narrowly lance-shaped with the narrower end towards the base, or elliptic, 15–25 mm (0.59–0.98 in) long and 2.5–4 mm (0.098–0.157 in) wide with a sharply-pointed tip and many, more or less parallel veins. The flowers are borne in 2 spherical heads in axils on a peduncle 3.0–3.5 mm (0.12–0.14 in) in diameter, each head with 18 to 25 golden-yellow flowers. Flowering occurs in August and September, and the fruit is a linear to strongly curved pod, 600 mm (24 in) long and about 3 mm (0.12 in) wide.

== Taxonomy ==
Acacia amyctica was first formally described in 1995 by Richard Sumner Cowan and Bruce Maslin in the journal Nuytsia from specimens collected near Salmon Gums in 1983. The specific epithet (amyctica) means "sharp", referring to the phyllodes.

== Distribution and habitat ==
This species of Acacia grows in flat, low woodland or in open mallee shrubland, its distribution limited to mostly between Salmon Gums and Grass Patch, but also in Peak Charles National Park and around Dunn Swamp.

== Conservation status ==
Acacia amystica is listed as "Priority Two" by the Government of Western Australia Department of Biodiversity, Conservation and Attractions meaning it may be threatened but is poorly known, only occurring in a few locations.

== See also ==
- List of Acacia species
