= Acacia microsperma =

Bowyakka

Scientific classification
- Kingdom: Plantae
- Clade: Tracheophytes
- Clade: Angiosperms
- Clade: Eudicots
- Clade: Rosids
- Order: Fabales
- Family: Fabaceae
- Subfamily: Caesalpinioideae
- Clade: Mimosoid clade
- Genus: Acacia
- Species: A. microsperma

Binomial name
- Acacia microsperma Pedley
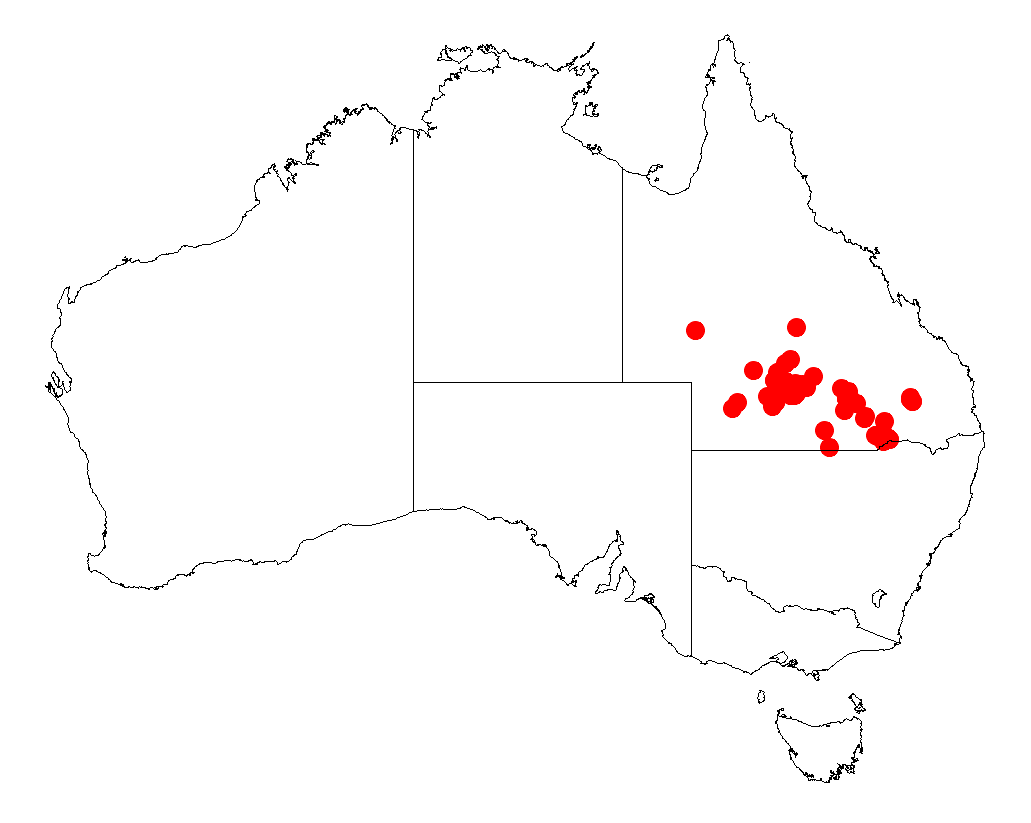
- Occurrence data from AVH

Synonyms
- Racosperma microspermum (Pedley) Pedley

Species of legume

Habit near Toompine

Acacia microsperma, commonly known as bowyakka, is a species of flowering plant in the family Fabaceae, and is endemic to Queensland, Australia. It is a tree with linear, more or less straight phyllodes, often with a slightly hooked tip, spherical heads of golden yellow flowers, and firmly papery pods appearing somewhat like a string of beads.

== Description ==
Acacia microsperma is a tree that typically grows to a height of up to 10 m (33 ft) and has branchlets that are scurfy and sometimes covered with soft hairs pressed against the surface. Its phyllodes are linear, more or less straight, 70–140 mm (2.8–5.5 in) long, 1.5–4 mm (0.059–0.157 in) wide, often with slightly hooked tips and many closely parallel but obscure veins. The flowers are borne in up to four spherical heads in racemes 0.5–2 mm (0.020–0.079 in) long on peduncles 3–10 mm (0.12–0.39 in) long. Each head is 4.5–5.0 mm (0.18–0.20 in) in diameter with 20 to 30 golden yellow flowers. Flowering occurs in August and September, and the pods are straight, firmly papery, up to 60 mm (2.4 in) long, 2–3 mm (0.079–0.118 in) wide, sparsely hairy and appear somewhat like a string of beads. The seeds are narrowly elliptic, 2.5–4 mm (0.098–0.157 in) long with a fleshy, repeatedly folded aril.

== Taxonomy ==
Acacia microsperma was first formally described in 1974 by the Leslie Pedley in Contributions from the Queensland Herbarium from specimens collected by Selwyn Lawrence Everist in 1946. The specific epithet (microsperma) means 'little seed'.

== Distribution and habitat ==
Bowyakka has a scattered distribution in southern Queensland between Adavale and Talwood where it usually grows shallow loam or clay over weathered rock, often forming dense stand along or with Acacia cambagei or Eucalyptus thozetiana.

== Conservation status ==
Acacia microsperma is listed as least concern under the Queensland Government Nature Conservation Act 1992.

== See also ==
- List of Acacia species
