= Acacia maranoensis =

Womel

Scientific classification
- Kingdom: Plantae
- Clade: Tracheophytes
- Clade: Angiosperms
- Clade: Eudicots
- Clade: Rosids
- Order: Fabales
- Family: Fabaceae
- Subfamily: Caesalpinioideae
- Clade: Mimosoid clade
- Genus: Acacia
- Species: A. maranoensis

Binomial name
- Acacia maranoensis Pedley
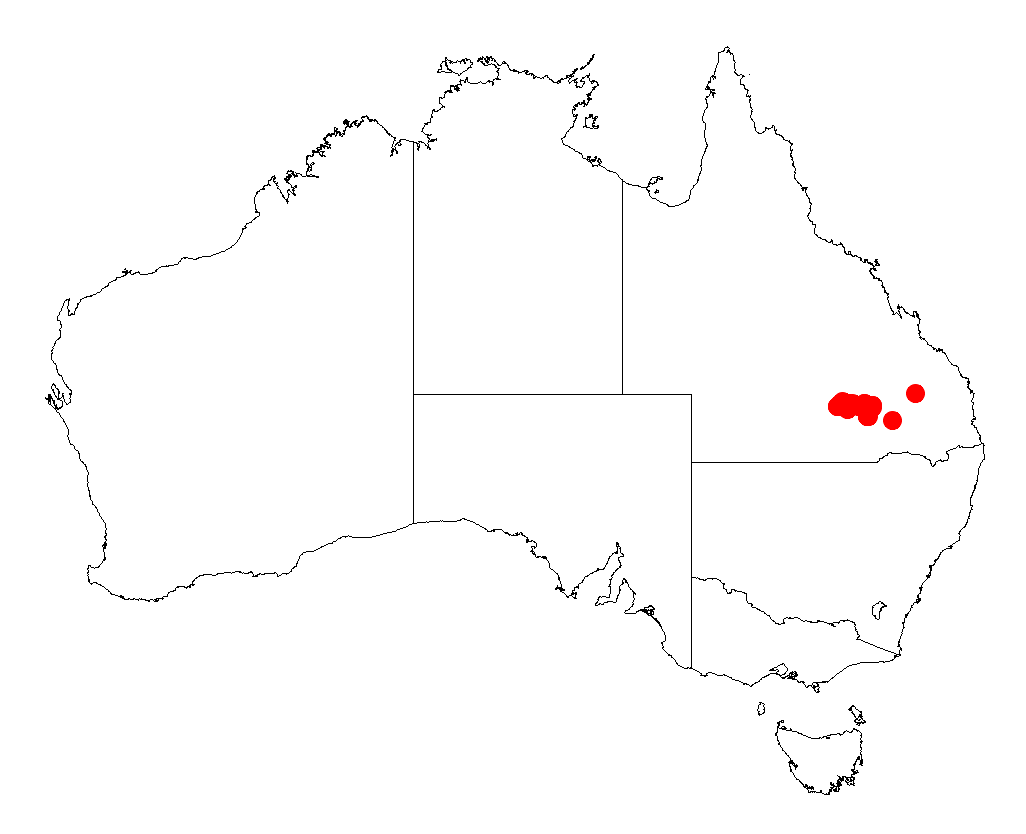
- Occurrence data from AVH

Synonyms
- Racosperma maranoense (Pedley) Pedley

Species of legume

Acacia maranoensis, commonly known as womel, is a species of flowering plant in the family Fabaceae and is endemic to Queensland, Australia. It is a tree with dark, furrowed bark, glabrous branchlets, linear to very narrowly elliptic phyllodes, spherical heads of yellow flowers, and narrowly oblong or linear, leathery pods.

== Description ==
Acacia maranoensis is a tree that typically grows to a height of up to 10 m (33 ft) and has dark, furrowed bark. Its branchlets are glabrous and covered with a rough, white resin deposit. The phyllodes are linear to very narrowly elliptic, straight to curved, 110–150 mm (4.3–5.9 in) long, 4–8 mm (0.16–0.31 in) wide and leathery with many closely parallel veins, up to three of which are slightly more prominent than the rest. The flowers are borne in spherical heads in three to six racemes on rough peduncles 3–10 mm (0.12–0.39 in) long, each head 4–6 mm (0.16–0.24 in) long with 30 to 60 yellow flowers. The pods are very narrowly oblong to linear, flat, straight to slightly curved, up to 65 mm (2.6 in) long, 4–8 mm (0.16–0.31 in) wide, leathery, slightly raised over and irregularly more or less constricted between the seeds. The seeds are broadly elliptic, about 4 mm (0.16 in) long, glossy dark brown with a small aril.

== Taxonomy ==
Acacia maranoensis was first formally described in 1978 by Leslie Pedley in the journal Austrobaileya from specimens he collected 50 km (31 mi) south-south-west of Roma in 1967.

== Distribution and habitat ==
Womel grows on flat terrain, where some areas are flooded after rain. The soils are dark brown, heavy clay loams that become boggy when wet. It usually grows in Eucalyptus populnea woodland and is restricted to the Roma-(Mitchell, Queensland|Mitchell) area in the Maranoa district of southern Queensland.

== Conservation status ==
Acacia maranoensis is listed as 'least concern' under the Queensland Government Nature Conservation Act 1992.

== See also ==
- List of Acacia species
