= James Townsend Mackay =

Scottish botanist

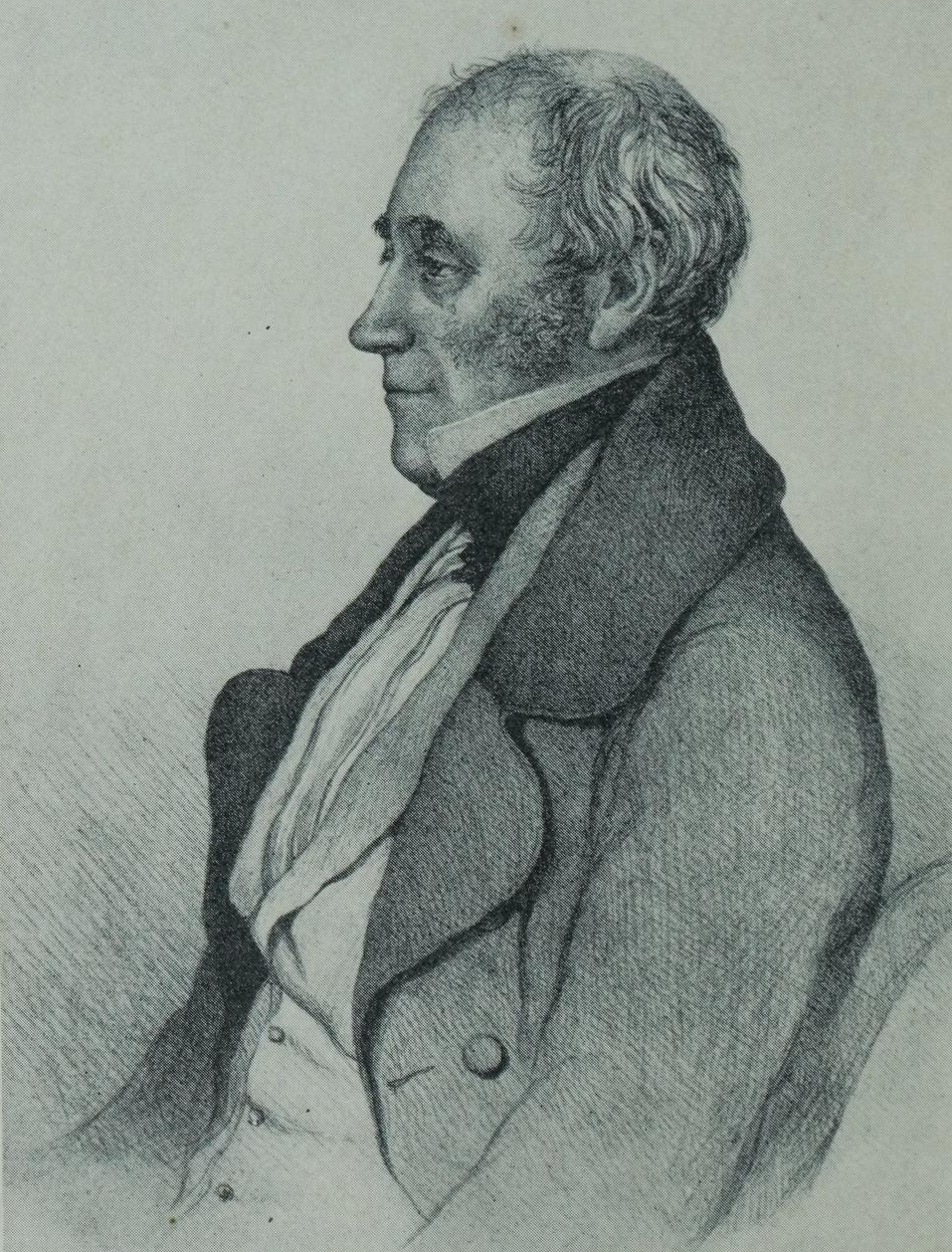

James Townsend Mackay (29 January 1775– 25 February 1862) was a Scottish botanist who worked in Ireland at the botanical garden of Trinity College, Dublin. He published Flora Hibernica in 1836 along with W. H. Harvey and T. Taylor.

== Life ==
Mackay was born in Kirkcaldy, Fife. After being educated at the parish school he was trained as a gardener, and having filled several posts in Scotland went to Ireland in 1803. Trinity College, Dublin, was building a botanical garden at the time and he was hired to lay out the garden and in 1806 he was made curator, a position he held until his death.

He visited the west of the island in 1804 and 1805, and as a result published a 'Catalogue of the Rarer Plants of Ireland' in the Transactions of the Royal Dublin Society for the following year. This catalogue he enlarged into the 'Catalogue of the Indigenous Plants of Ireland,' published in 1825 in the Transactions of the Royal Irish Academy, which was again the basis of his Flora Hibernica, published in 1836, the cryptogamic portion of which was by Drs. Harvey and Taylor.

Shortly after his appointment as curator he was elected an associate of the Linnean Society, and in 1850 the university of Dublin bestowed upon him the degree of LL.D. He was attacked by paralysis about 1860, and died of bronchitis in Dublin 25 February 1862.

Mackay discovered several species of plants new to the British Isles, and contributed largely to Sir J. E. Smith's English Botany (1790–1814). His herbarium is preserved at Trinity College Dublin. Several unsuccessful attempts were made to perpetuate his name, which is now borne by a genus of seaweeds, Mackaya, so named by Dr. Harvey, and by a species of heather, Erica mackayana which was discovered by the son of an inn-keeper friend.

== Works ==
- Flora Hibernica: comprising the Flowering plants, Ferns, Caraceae, Musci, Hepaticae, Lichenes and Algae of Ireland.(William Curry Jun and Company, Dublin, 1836). Full text.

== Sources ==
- University of Dublin; History, with Biographical Notices. William B. S. Taylor. London, 1845.
