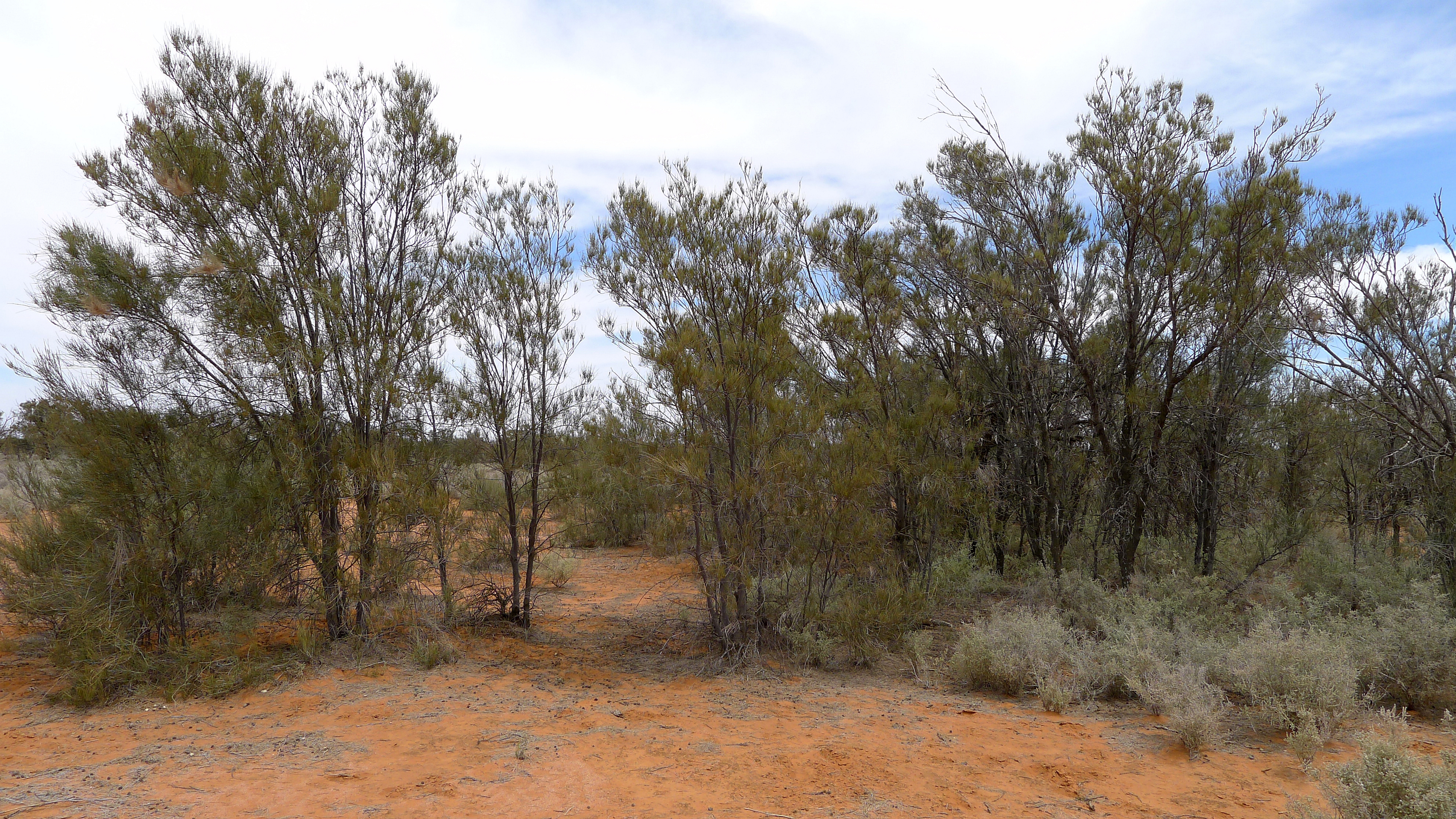
- In Kinchega National Park

Scientific classification
- Kingdom: Plantae
- Clade: Tracheophytes
- Clade: Angiosperms
- Clade: Eudicots
- Clade: Rosids
- Order: Fagales
- Family: Casuarinaceae
- Genus: Casuarina
- Species: C. pauper

Binomial name
- Casuarina pauper F.Muell. ex L.A.S.Johnson

Synonyms
- Casuarina cristata subsp. pauper (Miq.) L.A.S.Johnson nom. inval.; Casuarina pauper Miq. nom. inval.; Casuarina cristata auct. non Miq.: Willis, J.H. (1973); Casuarina lepidophloia auct. non F.Muell.: Black, J.M. (1924); Casuarina obesa auct. non Miq.: Barker, W.R., Barker, R.M., Jessop, J. & Vonow, H. (ed.) (18 March 2005)

= Casuarina pauper =

Species of plant

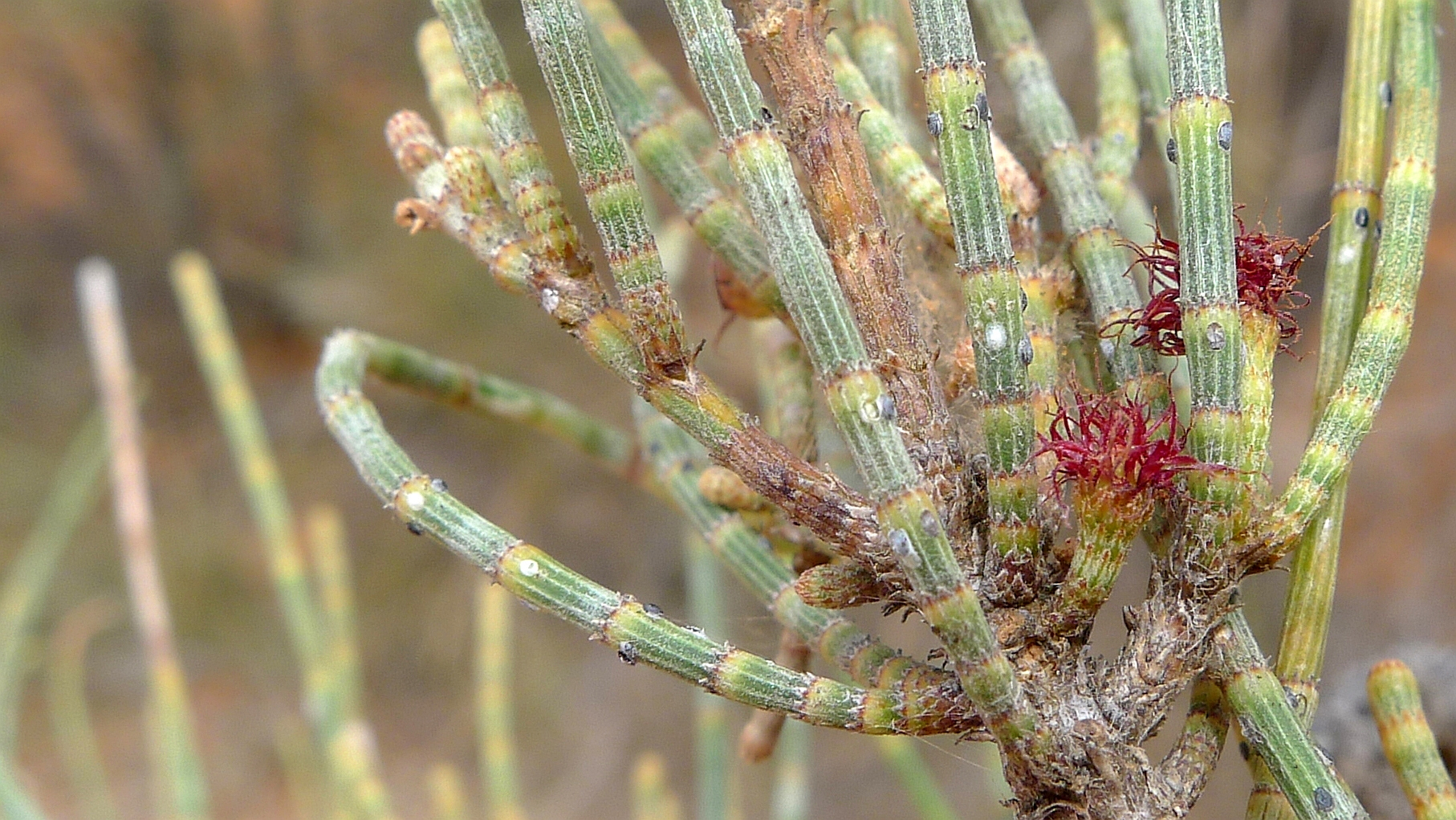
Branchlets and female flowers

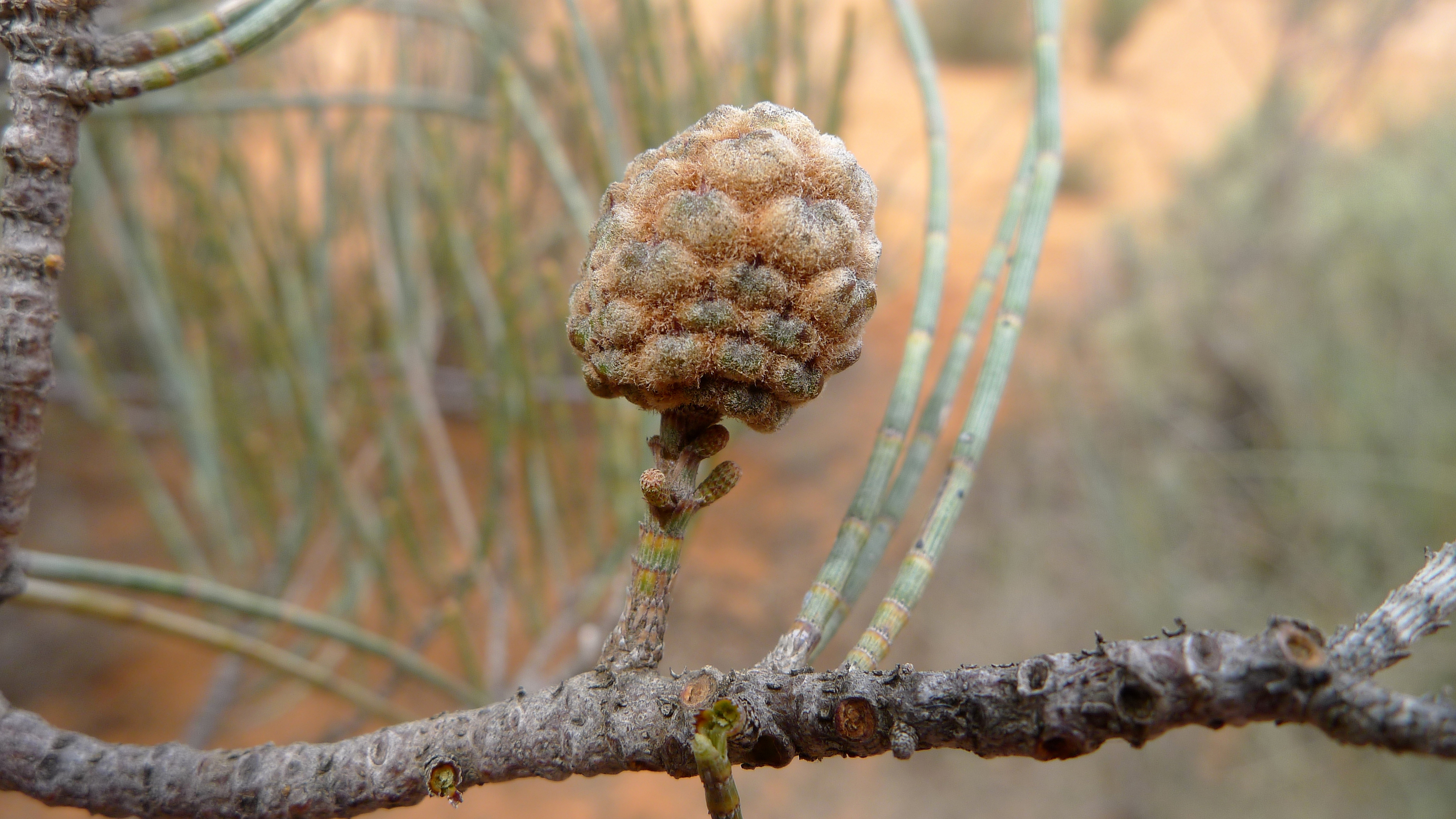
Mature cone

Casuarina pauper, commonly known as black oak, belah or kariku, is a species of flowering plant in the family Casuarinaceae and is endemic to southern continental Australia. It is a dioecious tree with fissured or scaly bark, waxy branchlets, the leaves reduced to scales in whorls of 9 to 13, the fruit 13–18 mm (0.51–0.71 in) long containing winged seeds (samaras) 5.5–7.0 mm (0.22–0.28 in) long.

== Description ==
Casuarina pauper is a dioecious tree similar to C. cristata, that typically grows to a height of 5–15 m (16–49 ft), has a DBH of up to 0.5 m (1 ft 8 in), and sometimes produces root suckers. The branchlets are more or less erect or spreading, up to 250 mm (9.8 in) long, the leaves reduced to scale-like teeth 0.8–0.9 mm (0.031–0.035 in) long, arranged in whorls of 9 to 13 around the branchlets. The sections of branchlet between the leaf whorls (the "articles") are waxy, 8–17 mm (0.31–0.67 in) long and 1.0–1.8 mm (0.039–0.071 in) wide. The flowers on male trees are arranged in spikes 10–30 mm (0.39–1.18 in) long, the anthers 0.8–1.1 mm (0.031–0.043 in) long. The female cones are covered with rusty hairs, on a peduncle 1–14 mm (0.039–0.551 in) long. The mature cones are usually 10–22 mm (0.39–0.87 in) long and 11–15 mm (0.43–0.59 in) in diameter, the samaras 5.5–7.0 mm (0.22–0.28 in) long.

This species is a poorer, stunted form of C. cristata, and the two species often intergrade where their ranges overlap.

== Taxonomy ==
Casuarina pauper was first formally described in 1989 by Lawrie Johnson in the Flora of Australia from a Ferdinand von Mueller's unpublished description of a plant he collected in the Flinders Ranges in 1851. The specific epithet (pauper) means "scanty" or "poor", referring to the habit of the species compared to C. cristata.

Johnson had previously described Casuarina cristata subsp. pauper (Miq.) L.A.S.Johnson in the journal Nuytsia, based Miquel's C. pauper, but the name was not valid, because Miquel explicitly did not accept von Mueller's description of Casuarina pauper, considering it the same species as C. cristata.

== Distribution and habitat ==
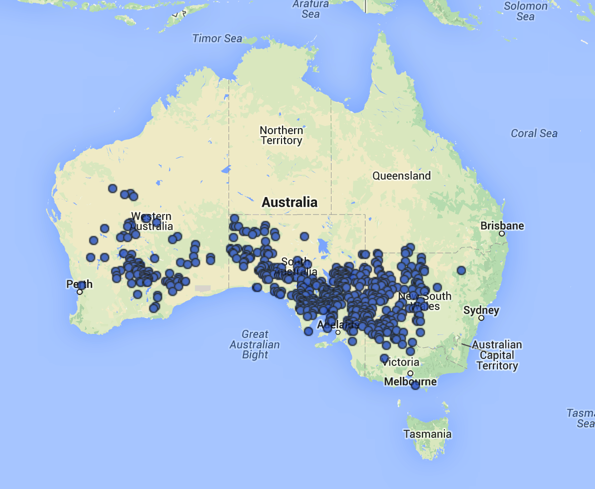
Occurrence records of Casuarina pauper within Australia.

Black oak grows in red-brown soils on open woodland, sometimes with Callitris gracilis, and is widespread across southern Australia, including in the far south-west of Queensland, western New South Wales, north-western Victoria, South Australia, and inland Western Australia.

This species is generally found growing in groves ranging in area from less than 1 to 10 ha (2.5 to 24.7 acres) at altitudes from 400–500 m (1,300–1,600 ft), and where the temperature ranges between 3 and 36 °C (37 and 97 °F).

== Ecology ==
Casuarina pauper produces abundant viable seed, with regeneration success likely to be inhibited during periods of insufficient soil moisture. When present at low densities, plants tends to reproduce sexually, while established groves extend mostly from the fringes through root suckers, increasing the local area occupied by individual plants.
