= Acacia lanei =

Hyden wattle

Conservation status
- Priority Three — Poorly Known Taxa (DEC)

Scientific classification
- Kingdom: Plantae
- Clade: Embryophytes
- Clade: Tracheophytes
- Clade: Spermatophytes
- Clade: Angiosperms
- Clade: Eudicots
- Clade: Rosids
- Order: Fabales
- Family: Fabaceae
- Subfamily: Caesalpinioideae
- Clade: Mimosoid clade
- Genus: Acacia
- Species: A. lanei

Binomial name
- Acacia lanei R.S.Cowan & Maslin
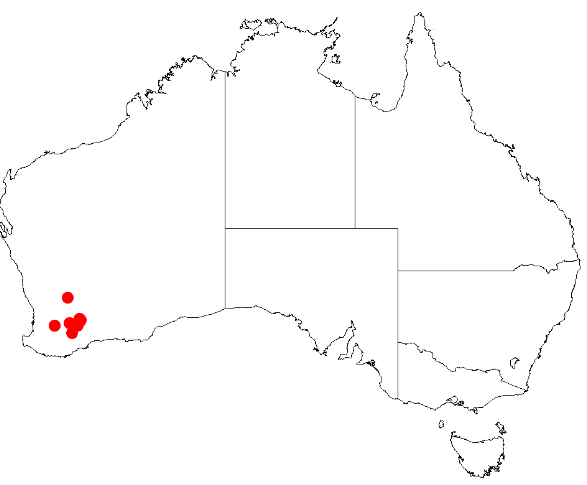
- Acacia lanei occurrence data from Australasian Virtual Herbarium

Synonyms
- Acacia aff. ixiophylla [P146] (R.Lane s.n. 7/82); Racosperma lanei (R.S.Cowan & Maslin) Pedley

Species of legume

Acacia lanei, commonly known as Hyden wattle, is a species of flowering plant in the family Fabaceae and is endemic to the south-west of Western Australia. It is a spreading shrub with ascending linear to elliptic phyllodes, spherical heads of yellow flowers, and linear, glabrous, thinly crusty pods raised over the seeds.

== Description ==
Acacia lanei is a spreading shrub that typically grows to a height of 1.5–2.3 m (5–8 ft) and has branchlets covered in silky white hairs often obscured by resin. Its phyllodes are ascending, linear to elliptic, straight or slightly curved, 45–60 mm (1.8–2.4 in) long, 3–5 mm (0.12–0.20 in) wide and glabrous except for silky white hairs at the base and on the pulvinus. The flowers are borne in one or two spherical heads in racemes on peduncles 3–5 mm (0.12–0.20 in) long, each head 4–6 mm (0.16–0.24 in) in diameter with 34 to 38 yellow flowers. Flowering occurs from July to September, and the pods are linear or bent, up to 120 mm (4.7 in) long and 2–3 mm (0.079–0.118 in) wide, thinly crusty, glabrous, sticky and raised over the seeds. The seeds are oblong, 3.5–4.5 mm (0.14–0.18 in) long with an aril on the end.

== Taxonomy ==
Acacia lanei was first formally described in 1990 by Richard Cowan and Bruce Maslin in the journal Nuytsia from specimens collected by Maslin 3.6 mi (5.8 km) east of Hyden on the road to Holt Rock in 1970. The specific epithet (lanei) honours Richard J. Lane, a Western Australian farmer who called the attention of botanists to the plant in July 1986 as "an excellent windbreak, because it is vigorous in growth and is not browsed by livestock".

== Distribution and habitat ==
Hyden wattle grows in association with salmon gum or York gum along creek and drainage lines on red or brown clay within 25 km (16 mi) south and east of Hyden in the Avon Wheatbelt and Mallee bioregions of south-western Western Australia.

== Conservation status ==
Acacia lanei is listed as 'Priority Three' by the Government of Western Australia Department of Parks and Wildlife, meaning that it is poorly known and known from only a few locations but is not under imminent threat.

== See also ==
- List of Acacia species
