= Taunton National Park =

National park in Queensland, Australia

- IUCN category II (national park)
- Location within Queensland
- Location: Queensland
- Nearest city: Emerald
- Coordinates: 23°32′00″S 149°13′17″E
- Area: 116 km^{2} (45 sq mi)
- Established: 1986
- Governing body: Queensland Parks and Wildlife Service

Taunton National Park is situated near the town of Dingo approximately 135 km inland from Rockhampton in eastern Central Queensland, Australia. The park encompasses an area of 11,626 ha (28,730 acres) within the Northern Brigalow Belt bioregion of Queensland; a region widely recognised to contain considerable biodiversity.

Taunton National Park is designated as a strictly scientific nature reserve due to its importance in ensuring the ongoing survival and protection of the endangered bridled nail-tail wallaby (Onychogalea fraenata). The wallabies protection has facilitated natural regeneration processes within reserve boundaries, protected ecosystem communities from further agricultural disturbances in the surrounding landscape, provided habitats for native fauna and helped conserve a wide range of biodiversity.

== Region description ==
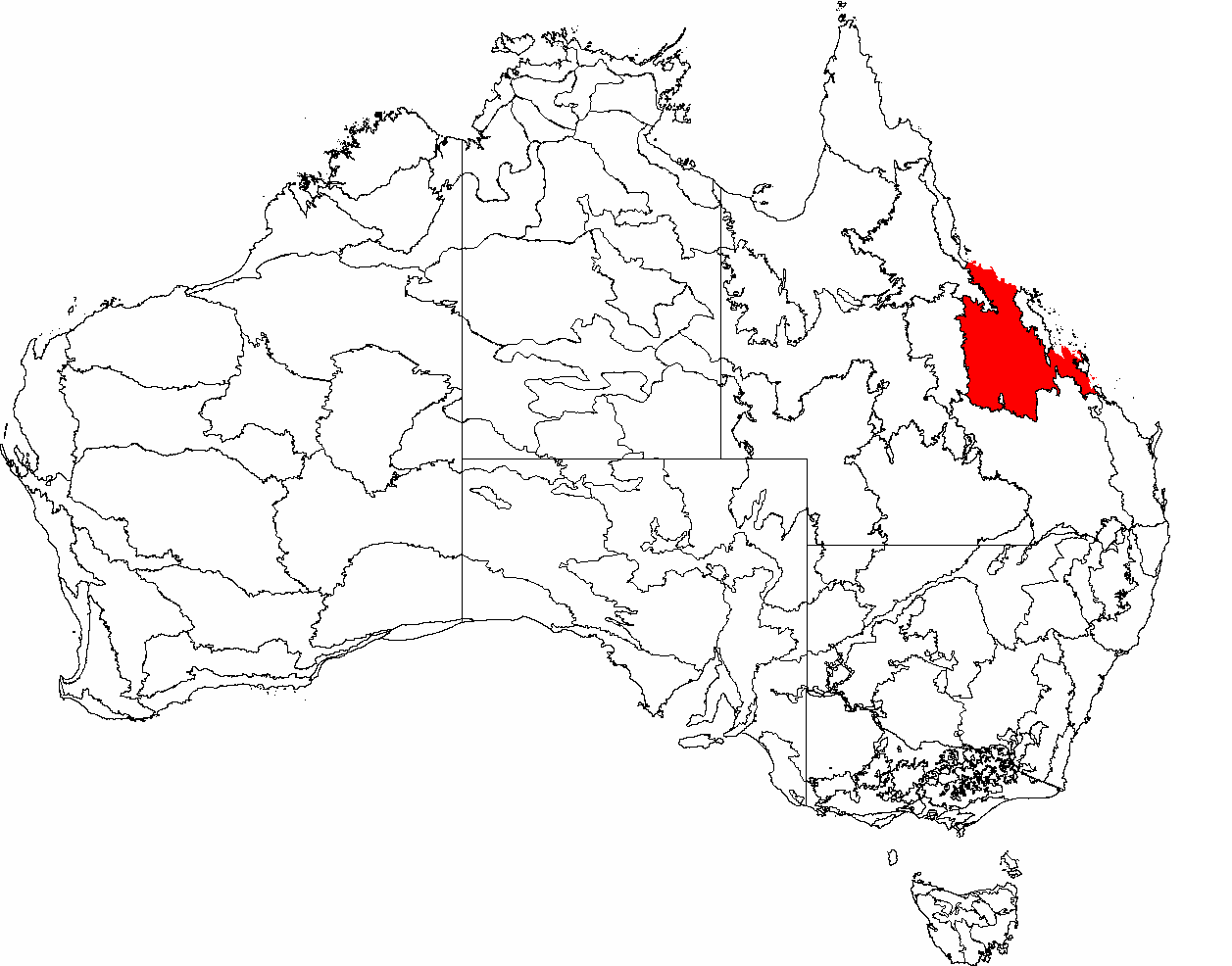
IBRA 6.1 Brigalow Belt North

Cracking clay soils and brigalow vegetation species are dominant in the northern region of the park, while texture-contrast soils in combination with Eucalypt communities dominate the western region. The parks topography is reasonably even, with a gradual slope from the north and western ends of the park towards the eastern and southern margins. The regions climate is described as subtropical and semi-arid; with a mean annual rainfall of 711 mm, half of which is confined to the summer months - December to February. The distribution of rainfall over such a condensed period leaves the area prone to droughts; with a sustained drought event occurring, on average, once a decade. The most recent drought of significance occurred between 1991 and 1995 with detrimental impacts on the surviving bridled nailtail wallaby population.

As is typical of the tropical savannah in the Northern Brigalow Belt, a combination of open, grassy Eucalypt woodlands, transitional zones and regrowing Acacia shrub-lands and forests comprise Taunton National Parks main vegetation zones. The most common vegetation associations within the park and surrounding areas, tend to be dominated by either brigalow (Acacia harpophylla) or poplar box (Eucalyptus populnea) species, which commonly occur along with other Acacia and Eucalyptus spp. Water-bodies present within the park boundaries consist of 15 dams and a small number of creeks.

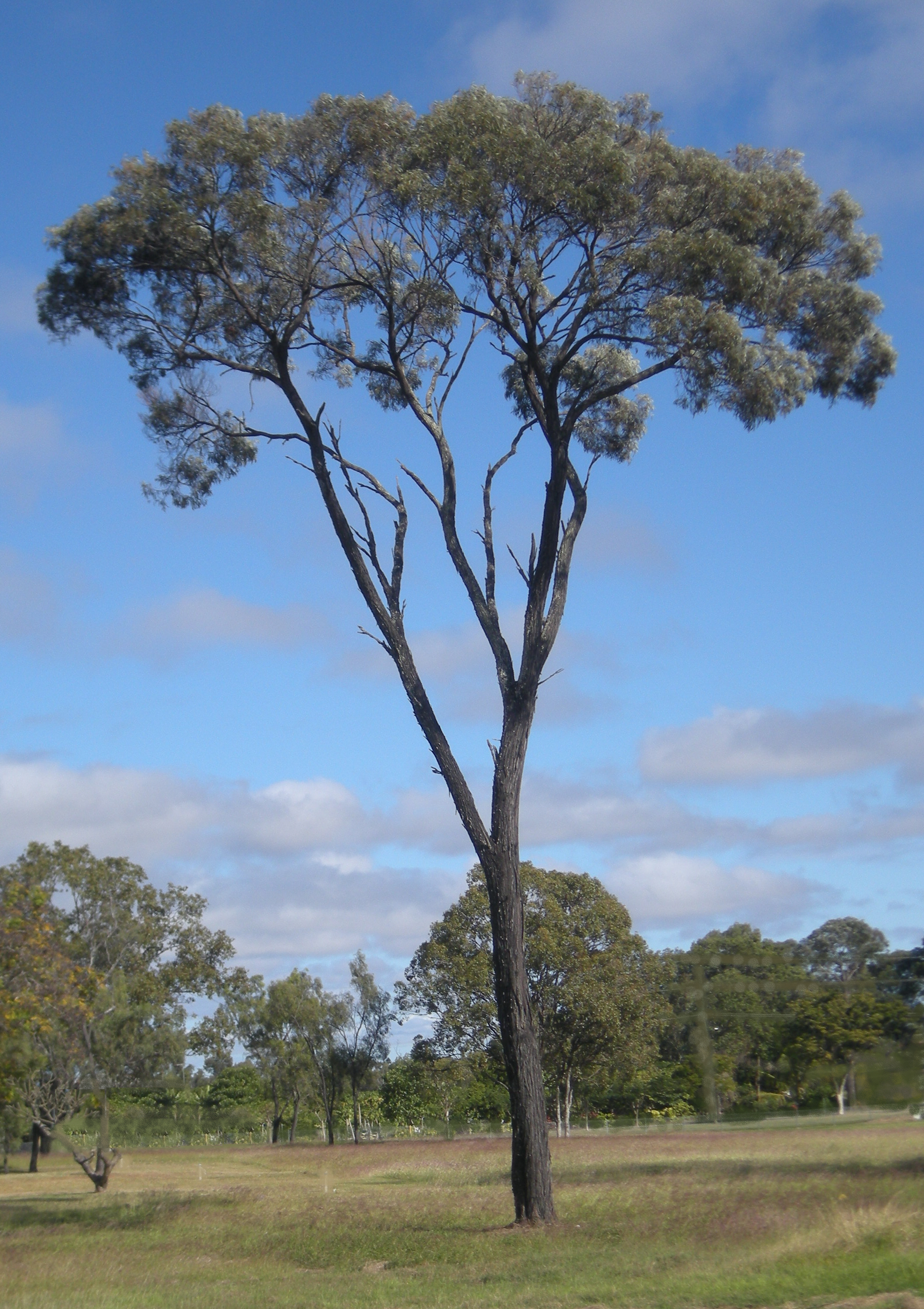
Brigalow Tree - A. harpophylla

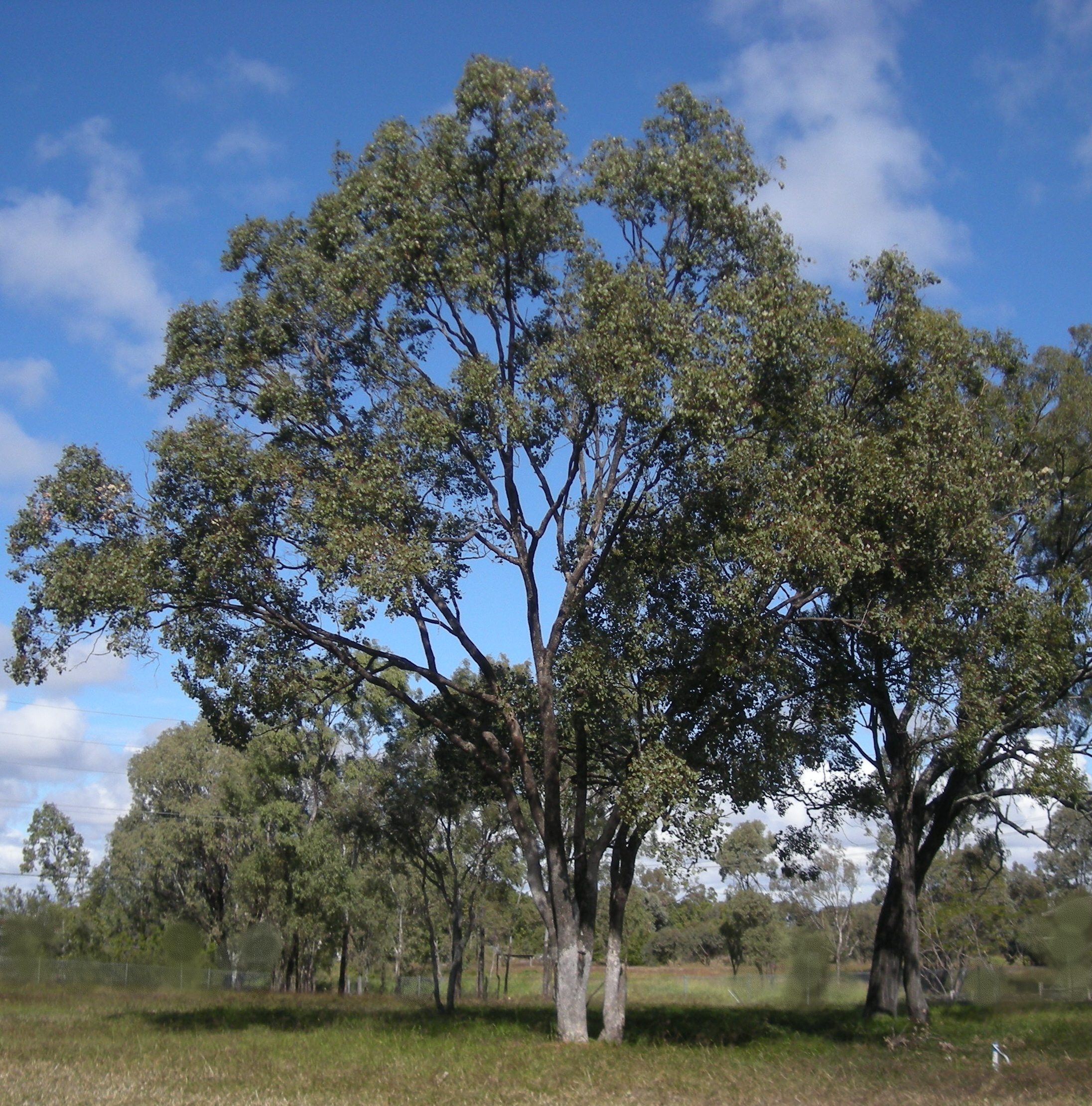
Poplar Box - Eucalyptus populnea

== History ==
The region in which Taunton National Park is located, was (and still is) subject to long-term, wide-scale agricultural development and associated disturbances. During the 1950s and 1960s extensive clearance of brigalow scrub began to take place in order to establish pastoral grasses for grazing domestic sheep and cattle. buffel grass (Cenchrus ciliaris) was widely sowed for fodder in the cleared areas, and rapidly became irreversibly established.

A governmental initiative called the 'Brigalow Development Scheme' provided great incentive for increasing agricultural development in the Brigalow region and accelerated the rate and scale of vegetation clearance for conversion to buffel grass. The success of this scheme resulted in agricultural system adjustments so that more intensive land use practices became common, with smaller properties and higher stock numbers. The cumulative effects of this land use change resulted in a considerable reduction in remnant vegetation patch size and occurrence. This in turn reduced the availability of habitat, food and shelter for native fauna, and altered the natural vegetation composition.

=== Park establishment ===
In 1973 a bridled nail-tail wallaby was sighted on a cattle property named 'Taunton' and reported by a fencing contractor. There had been reports of a significant decline in the wallabies population numbers during the early 1900s with no recorded sightings since the 1930s, and subsequently the species had been presumed extinct. Following this sighting, Taunton was purchased in 1979 and established as a scientific reserve, solely to ensure the protection and survival of the endangered wallaby. Then in 1984, another cattle property 'Red Hill', situated adjacent to Taunton, was added to the reserve and the whole area later became officially named 'Taunton National Park'.

== Biology and ecology ==
The park occurs in the Northern Brigalow 'Tropical Savannah' ecoregion, which is so named for the predominant flora species of the region; 'brigalow', hereafter referred to as Acacia harpophylla. Vegetation clearance throughout this district and in fact the whole Brigalow Belt, has resulted in an extensive loss of biodiversity and overall ecosystem degradation. Despite considerable regional agricultural and pastoral development, a large proportion of the park's vegetation remained intact or was exposed to minimal disturbance prior to the reserve being established. The park has high regional significance today as only 17% of vegetation within the park had been removed by 1975 (approximately), thereby conserving once prevalent, regionally representative ecosystems and vegetation communities, which are now often restricted to bush fragments and reserves.

The region that the park is located in has been demonstrated to have one of the highest rate of annual clearance, when compared with other subregions within Queensland. This high clearance rate has contributed to a number of Brigalow-typical ecosystems becoming otherwise at risk or endangered, which highlights the importance of the parks biodiversity, as 12 of the regions ecosystems are represented within the reserve. Endangered open forest or woodland ecosystems in the park include; vegetation associations dominated by A. harpophylla with either belah (Casuarina cristata) or dawson gum (Eucalyptus cambageana), or in combination with wilga (Geijera parviflora) and false sandalwood (Eremophila mitchellii). Brigalow shrubland/forest assemblages of A. harpophylla with yellow-wood (Terminalia oblongata) and false sandalwood, are also endangered, having undergone wide-scale clearing throughout the 1900s. Ecosystem communities represented within the park which are considered to be 'of concern' include; open and grassy woodlands dominated by poplar box (E. populnea) and grassy or scrubby woodlands that are dominated by Eucalyptus spp. with or without Corymbia spp.

=== Flora ===
The reserve supports a wide diversity of flora, with over 190 species recorded. Typical brigalow communities which are found in the park include; grassy and shrubby woodlands or open forests, whipstick brigalow, sucker brigalow, and open forests where A. harpophylla and another species such as yellow-wood, belah or various Eucalyptus spp. dominate. Endangered plant species protected inside the park include the Solanaceae Solanum adenophorum and the Solanaceae Solanum elachophyllum. In addition to these, another two species have been identified as 'near threatened'; the Apocynaceae Cerbera dumicola and the Poaceae Dichanthium setosum.

Dense acacia forests or 'brigalow scrub' encompass 30% of the parks area, with species typical of the endangered Brigalow shrubland/forest ecosystem described previously, or can include combinations of A. harpophylla with dawson gum or poplar box. The most dominant vegetation association, covering 39% of the parks area, is the grassy eucalypt woodlands which are dominated by poplar box in combination with the silver-leaved ironbark (E. melanophloia), the narrow-leaved ironbark, (E. crebra), the long-fruited bloodwood (E. polycarpa) and the grey box (E. moluccana). The transitional zones between the Acacia dominated forests and Eucalpyt dominated woodlands are composed of combinations of characteristics particular to each ecosystem type, and only contribute to 14% of the parks total area. The remaining land was previously cleared and is undergoing natural regeneration, primarily by A. harpophylla.

=== Fauna ===
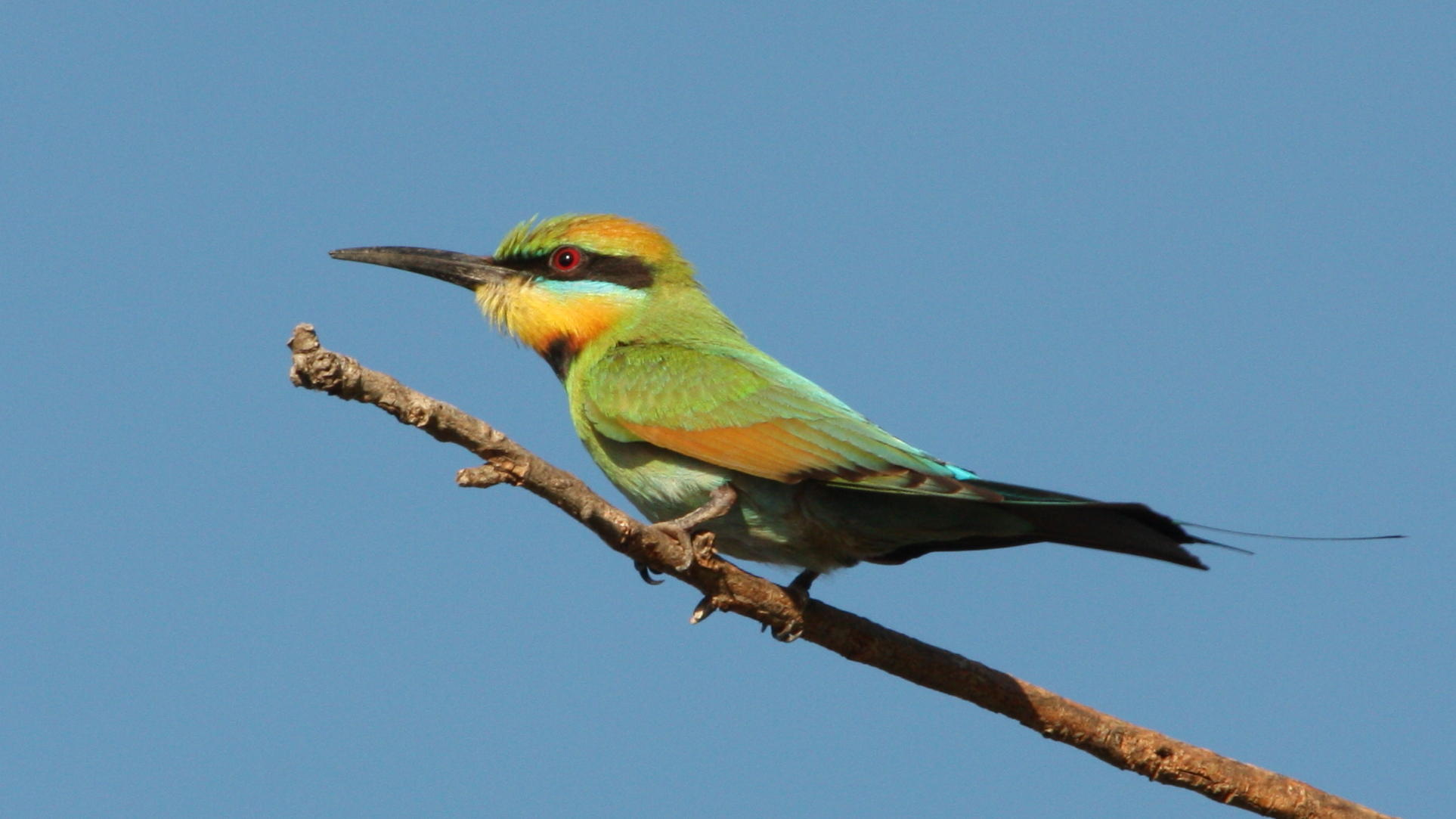
Rainbow bee eater, Merops ornatus

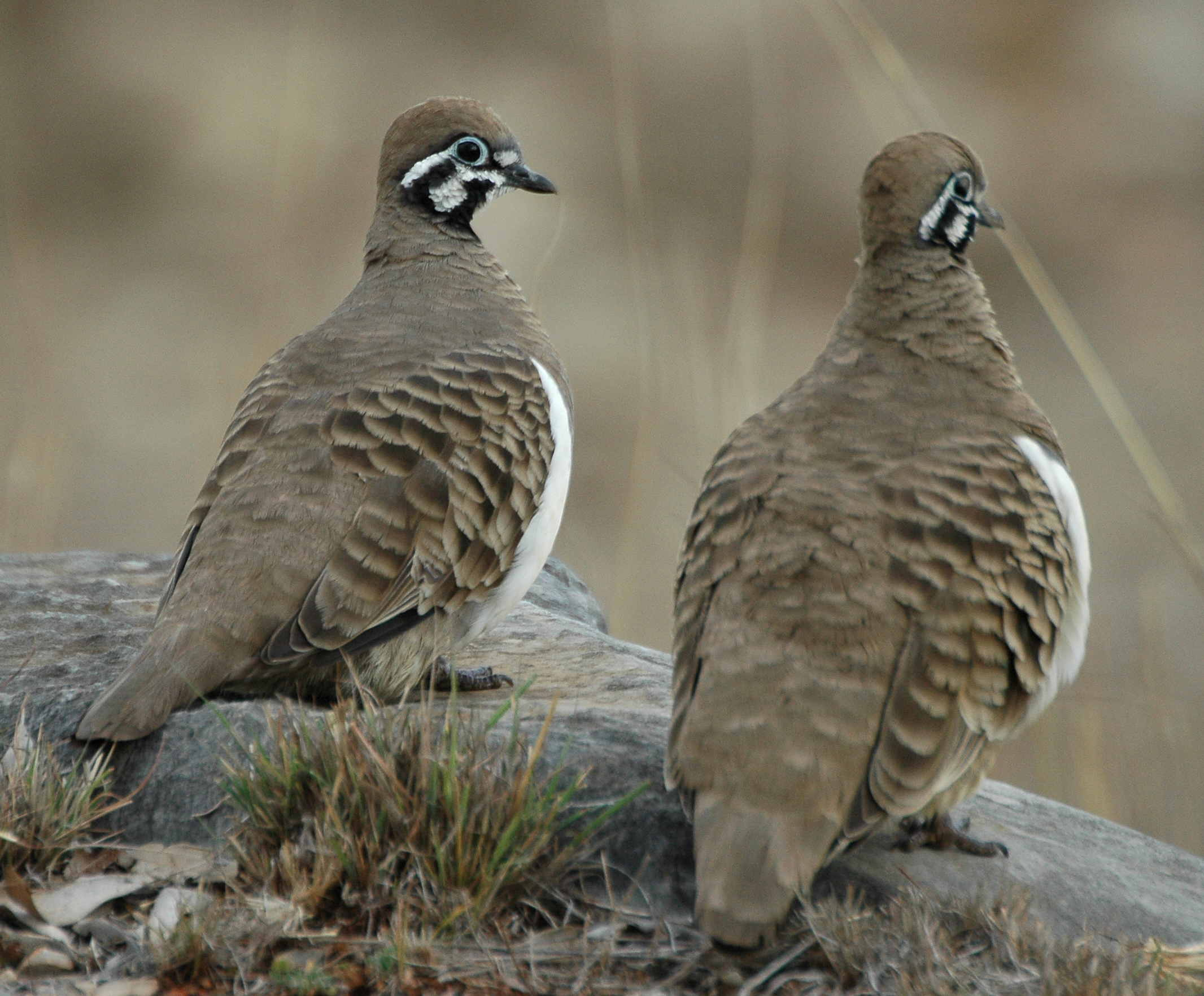
Squatter Pigeons, Geophaps scripta scripta

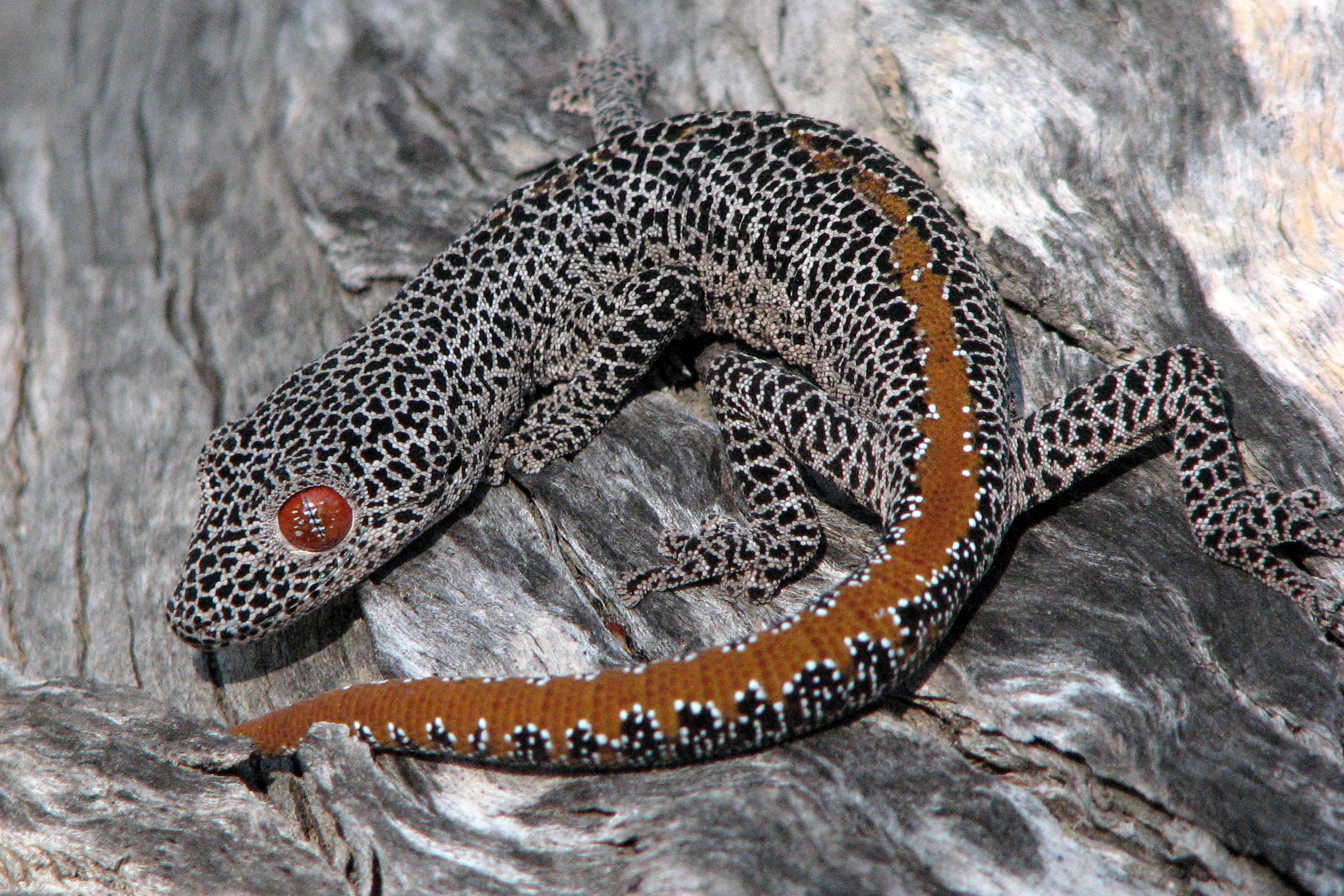
Golden Tailed Gecko, Strophurus taenicauda

The protection of Taunton National Park has provided an important refuge and habitat for a wide range of biodiversity including various macropod species (kangaroos and wallabies etc.) and other mammals, over 70 species of bird and numerous reptiles and snakes. Notable bird species known to inhabit the reserve include the vulnerable Southern subspecies of squatter pigeon (Geophaps scripta scripta) and the migratory rainbow bee-eater (Merops ornatus), which is protected under various international migratory bird agreements. Reptile species of significance inhabiting the reserve include the vulnerable brigalow scaly-foot lizard (Paradelma orientalis) and the arboreal golden-tailed gecko (Strophurus taenicauda) (NPRS) which is classified as near threatened. In addition to the bridled nailtail wallaby, a number of macropods have a distribution range which extends through the reserve. These can include the black-striped wallaby (Macropus dorsalis), the eastern grey kangaroo (M. giganteus), the common wallaroo (M.robustus) and the swamp wallaby (Wallabia bicolour). Other mammals found in the park include the large-eared pied bat (Chalinolobus dwyeri), which is listed as vulnerable, and the iconic Australian koala (Phascolarctos cinereus) More common bird species found in the park include; populations of spotted bower bird (Chlamydera maculata), the variegated fairy-wren (Malurus lamberti), superb fairy-wren (Malurus cyaneus) and red-backed fairy-wren (Malurus melanocephalus).

==== Bridled nail-tail wallaby ====
The park contains the only naturally occurring population of Australia's most endangered macropod; the bridled nailtail wallaby. The wallaby is now restricted to less than 1% of its former distribution, which originally extended from the Murray River near the New South Wales border, up to Charters Towers in northern Queensland. Causes for the original population decline are complex, but are generally thought to have arisen from a combination of interacting factors including predation and drought. The wallaby population impacts from these processes have been further exacerbated by habitat fragmentation and degradation caused by wide-scale vegetation clearance, and increased competition for food resources with domestic animals, particularly sheep.

Between 1979 and the late 1980s, population numbers were estimated to be between 1000 and 1400 individuals. Despite concerted efforts and various management approaches population numbers have continued to decline, a situation which is often attributed to the sustained drought which occurred in the early 1990s. Droughts are known to directly impact the wallaby through the reduced availability of food resources, while also indirectly increasing predation pressure as the level of protective habitat cover is decreased and overall prey numbers continue to decline. Known predators of the wallaby include; feral cats and dogs, dingoes (Canis lupus) wedge-tailed eagles (Aquila audax) and large pythons. To reduce predation, dingo and wild dog baiting is regularly conducted, and the Sporting Shooters Association of Australia also carries out hunting expeditions, targeting the feral species and dingoes in the park and surrounding areas.

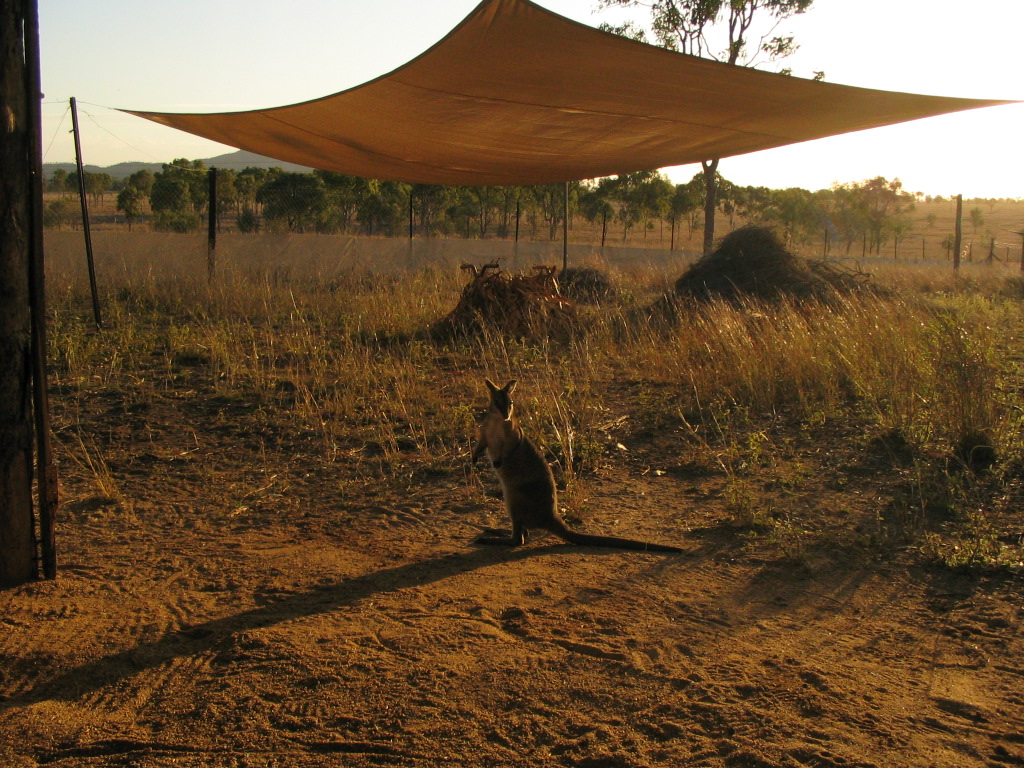
Bridle nailtail wallaby, Onychogalea fraenata

More recent population estimates for the bridled nailtail wallaby suggest that numbers within the park are around 500 individuals. Two translocated wild populations exist; one at Idalia National Park and the other a privately owned cattle property - 'Avocet', with additional captive breeding populations in Townsville, Rockhampton and the Gold Coast. All of these external populations were originally sourced from Taunton National Park, with the aim of increasing the range extent and total number of populations, to reduce the risk of any chance event causing extinction. In spite of these contingencies, the wild population at Taunton National Park is still considered the most important for the continued survival of the species as it has the highest levels of genetic diversity, and is therefore an important source for supplementing gene pools of the translocated populations.

== Environmental threats ==
Taunton National Park and the biodiversity it supports are subjected to various threatening processes, particularly in regard to predation or competition with introduced feral species and invasive plants. Bridled nailtail wallabies are regular prey of the dingo, which preferentially targets adult individuals and is recognised as posing a significant threat to the species long-term survival. Contrastingly, feral cats appear to target juvenile wallabies, effectively reducing the number of individuals which survive long enough to contribute to the breeding population, thereby contributing further to declining numbers.

Invasive plant species pose increasing threats to the parks biodiversity. Particularly notorious weeds invading the park include; giant rats tail grass (Sporobolus spp.), Mother of Millions (Bryophyllum spp.), buffel grass, harissia cactus (Eriocereus martini), parthenium (Parthenium hysterophorus) and the rubber vine (Cryptostegia grandiflora). In particular, advancing encroachment of the pastoral buffel grass is significant due to its capacity to alter the structure of the shrub understorey in the native vegetation, and its capacity for vigorous growth and drought resistance can result in the creation of impenetrable walls of grass which also hinders through-movement by smaller mammals. Buffel grass is also highly competitive with herbaceous species such as legumes, native grasses and forbs; which reduces native food availability and biodiversity. Fire threats compound the issue, as Buffel grass growth is stimulated by burning, which not only raises the risk and severity of fires by increasing fuel availability, but also burns at higher temperatures than the Acacia overstorey can tolerate, which reduces and degrading the natural habitat.

== Management ==
Management of Taunton National Park is conducted by the Queensland Parks and Wildlife Service (QPWS), under the Department of Environment and Heritage Protection (DERM). To ensure that cultural heritage values are protected with park management decisions, there is an ongoing partnership between the QPWS and the indigenous land owners; the Kangoulu and Ghungalu people. General objectives of park management include ensuring the protection and preservation of the parks ecological and biological diversity and values, and ensuring the continued survival of the bridled nail-tail wallaby through provision of predator control and adequate habitat and food resources.

Pest plant management is ongoing in order to control the range and establishment of invasive plant species, and reduce competition with native plants. In addition, regular predator control measures are implemented to lower predation pressures on the wallaby, and continued monitoring is conducted to assess the effects and success rate of these pest management strategies. Domestic stock animals are excluded from the park via fencing, to reduce competition for the wallabies food resources as well as preventing ground and vegetation compaction via trampling. Wallaby population abundance is monitored by quarterly 4-day surveys which span the entire park, to ensure rapid management responses to notable declines in numbers, while issues arising from fire threats, such as destruction of the wallabies brigalow shrub habitat, are managed through fire breaks and controlled burn regimes.

== See also ==
- Protected areas of Queensland
- Wildlife management
