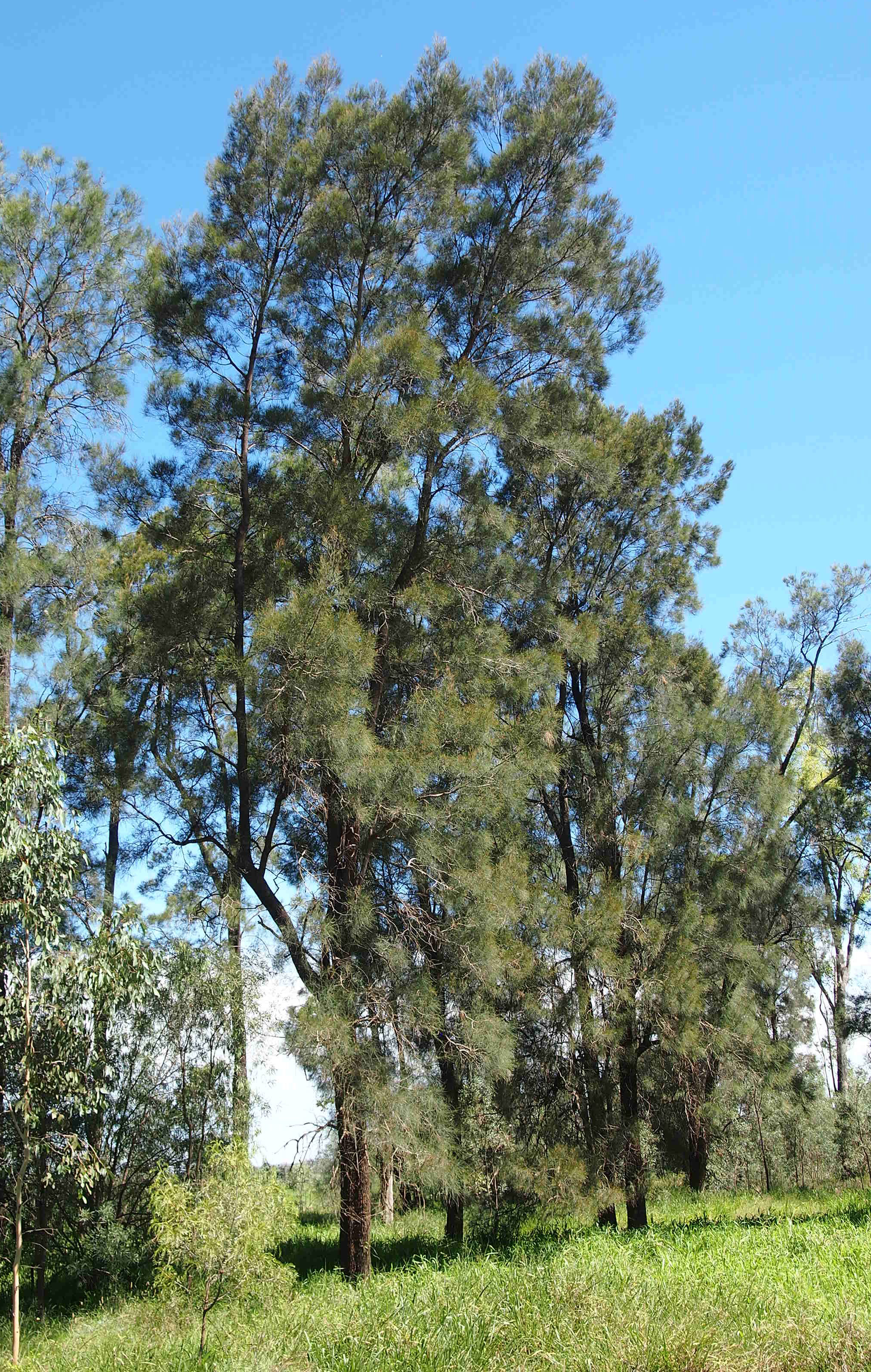

Scientific classification
- Kingdom: Plantae
- Clade: Tracheophytes
- Clade: Angiosperms
- Clade: Eudicots
- Clade: Rosids
- Order: Fagales
- Family: Casuarinaceae
- Genus: Casuarina
- Species: C. cristata

Binomial name
- Casuarina cristata Miq.

Synonyms
- Casuarina cambagei R.T.Baker; Casuarina cristata Miq. subsp. cristata; Casuarina lepidophloia F.Muell.; Casuarina quadrivalvis var. cristata (Miq.) Miq.

= Casuarina cristata =

Species of tree

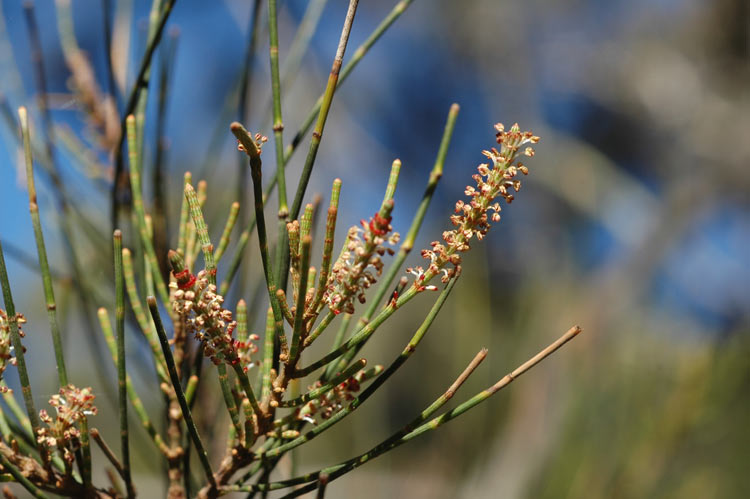
Male flowers

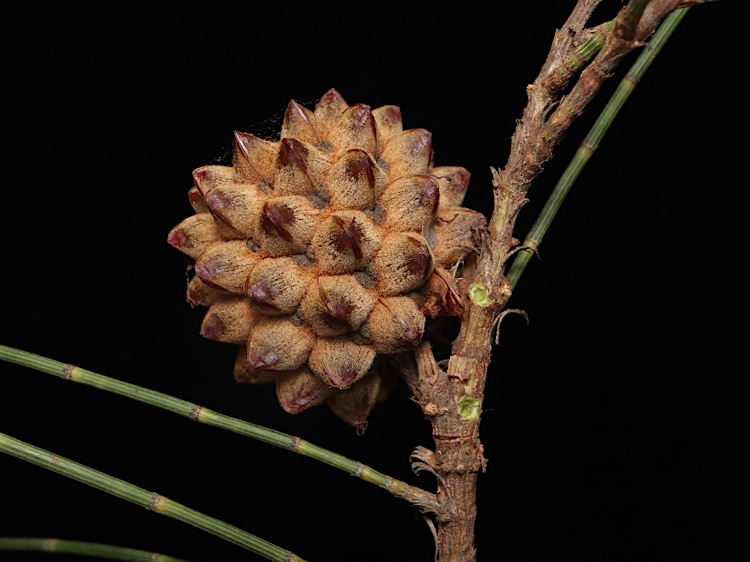
Fruit

Casuarina cristata, commonly known as belah or muurrgu, is a species of flowering plant in the family Casuarinaceae and is endemic to inland eastern Australia. It is a tree with fissured or scaly bark, sometimes drooping branchlets, the leaves reduced to scales in whorls of 8 to 12, the fruit 13–18 mm (0.5–0.7 in) long containing winged seeds (samaras) 6.0–10.5 mm (0.2–0.4 in) long.

== Description ==
Casuarina cristata is a dioecious tree that typically grows to a height of 10–20 m (33–66 ft), has a DBH of up to 1 m (3 ft 3 in), and often produces suckers. Its bark is finely fissured or scaly and dark greyish brown. The branchlets are often drooping, up to 250 mm (9.8 in) long, the leaves reduced to scale-like teeth 0.5–0.7 mm (0.02–0.03 in) long, arranged in whorls of 8 to 12 around the branchlets. The sections of branchlet between the leaf whorls (the "articles") are 8–17 mm (0.3–0.7 in) long and 0.6–0.9 mm (0.02–0.04 in) wide. The flowers on male trees are arranged in spikes 13–50 mm (0.5–2.0 in) long, the anthers 0.8–1.1 mm (0.03–0.04 in) long. The female cones are covered with rusty hairs when young, later glabrous, on a peduncle 1–14 mm (0.04–0.6 in) long. The mature cones are usually 13–18 mm (0.5–0.7 in) long and 10–16 mm (0.4–0.6 in) in diameter, the samaras 6.0–10.5 mm (0.2–0.4 in) long.

== Taxonomy ==
Casuarina cristata was first formally described in 1848 by Dutch botanist Friedrich Anton Wilhelm Miquel in his book Revisio critica Casuarinarum from specimens collected by Allan Cunningham near the Lachlan River. The specific epithet cristata means 'crested', possibly referring to the long, pointed bracteoles on the cones. The tree is called muurrgu or murrgu in the Yuwaalaraay dialect of the Gamilaraay language around Walgett in northwestern New South Wales. Other common names include scaly-barked casuarina, scrub she-oak, billa, ngaree, bulloak and swamp oak.

== Distribution and habitat ==
Belah is found from Clermont in central Queensland south through to Temora in southern New South Wales. It is an important component of the endangered Brigalow ecological community of inland New South Wales and Queensland. Here it is found as a dominant tree with brigalow (Acacia harpophylla), black gidyea (A. argyrodendron), bimble box (Eucalyptus populnea), Dawson River blackbutt (E. cambageana), E. pilligaensis and the smaller trees such as wilga (Geijera parviflora) and false sandalwood (Eremophila mitchellii) in open forest over mainly Cenozoic clay plains. Other plants it grows with include boonaree (Alectryon oleifolius), sugarwood (Myoporum platycarpum) and nelia (Acacia loderi). On limestone-based soils, it may have a dense understory composed of pearl bluebush (Maireana sedifolia) or black bluebush (M. pyramidata)

== Ecology ==
Belah can reproduce by suckering from its root system, and clonal stands have been recorded. Seedlings only appear after periods of high rainfall.
