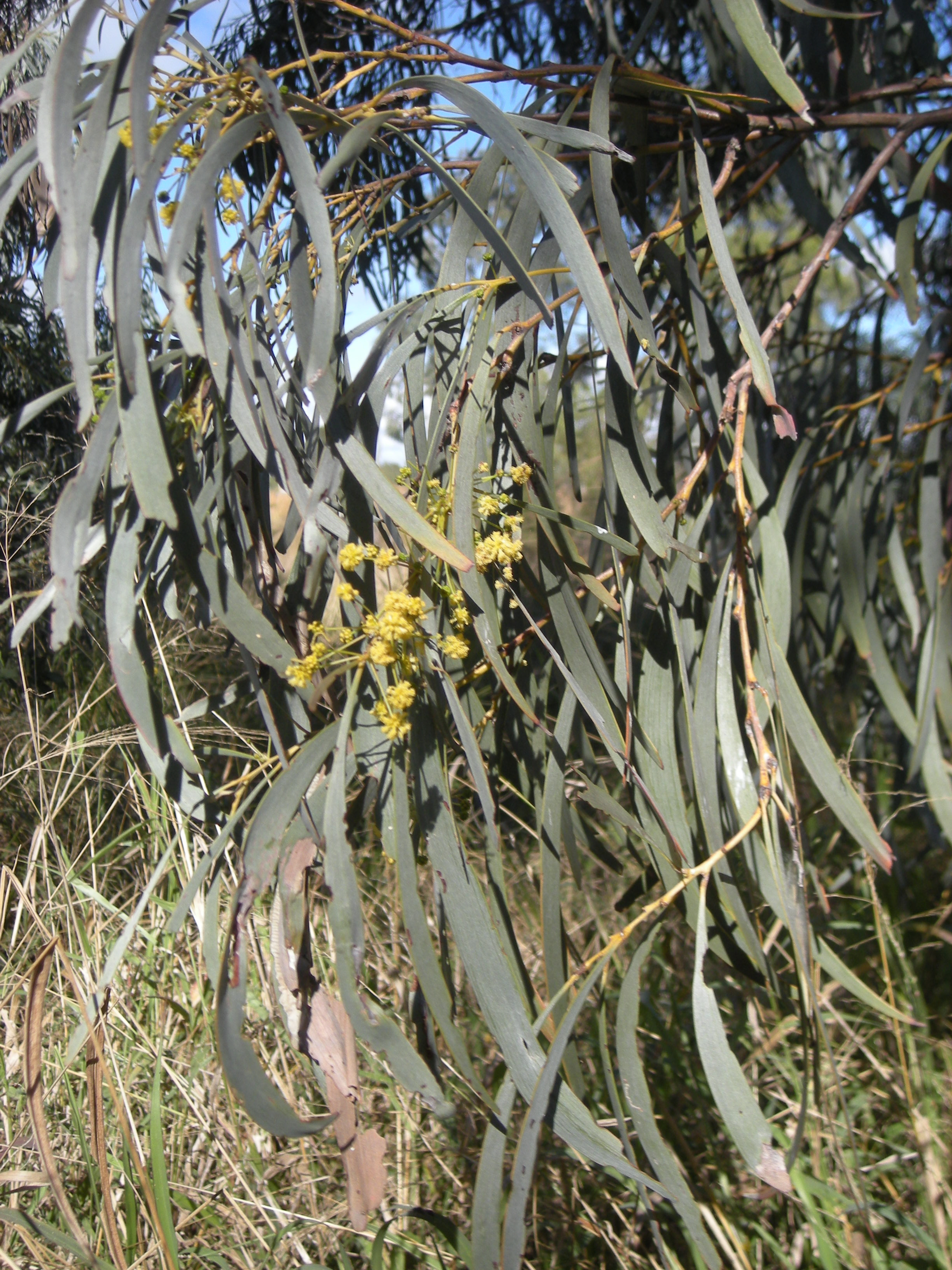

Conservation status
- Least Concern (IUCN 3.1)

Scientific classification
- Kingdom: Plantae
- Clade: Tracheophytes
- Clade: Angiosperms
- Clade: Eudicots
- Clade: Rosids
- Order: Fabales
- Family: Fabaceae
- Subfamily: Caesalpinioideae
- Clade: Mimosoid clade
- Genus: Acacia
- Species: A. harpophylla

Binomial name
- Acacia harpophylla F.Muell. ex Benth.
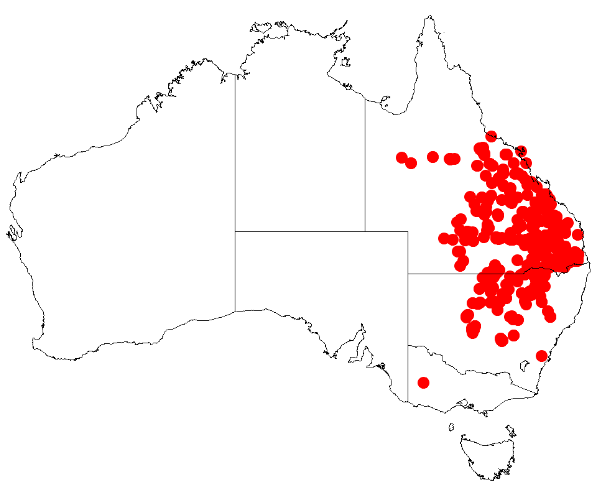
- Occurrence data from AVH

Synonyms
- Racosperma harpophyllum (Benth.) Pedley

= Acacia harpophylla =

Brigalow

Species of legume

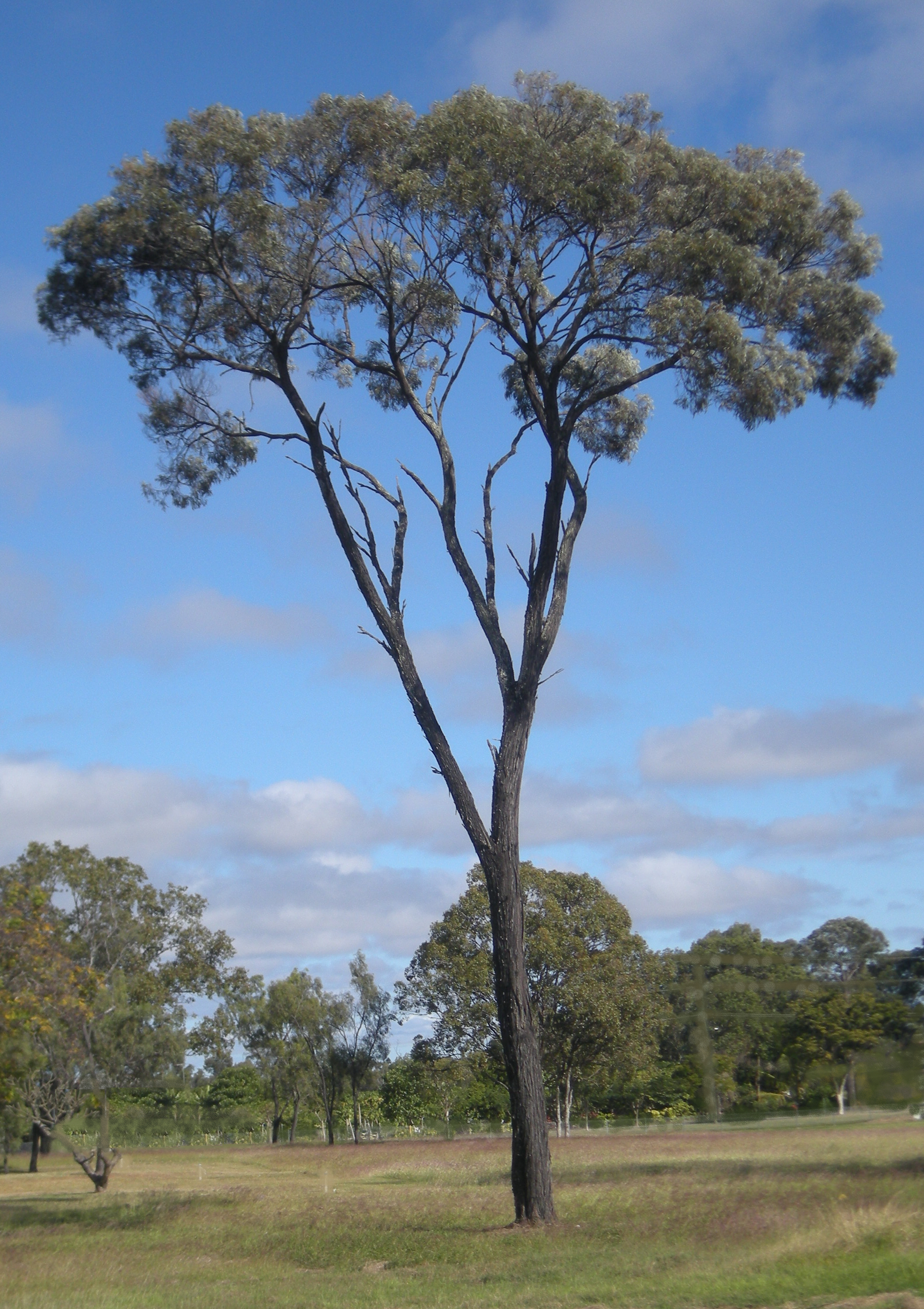
Remnant brigalow tree, coastal central Queensland, ~20m tall

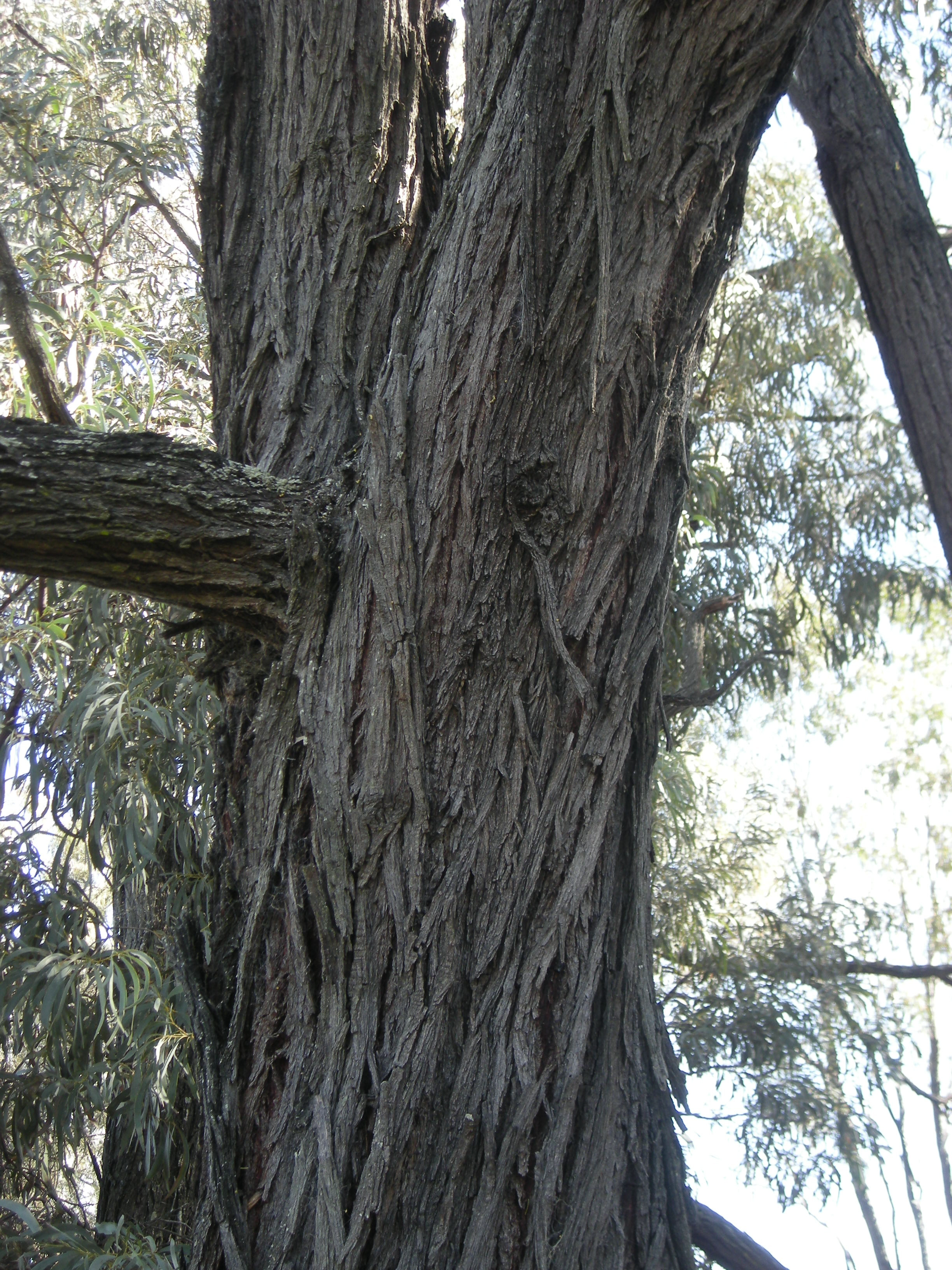
Brigalow bark

Acacia harpophylla, commonly known as brigalow, brigalow spearwood, orkor or ogarah, is a species of flowering plant in the family Fabaceae and is endemic to eastern Australia. It is a tree with sickle-shaped phyllodes, spherical heads of golden yellow flowers and subterete straight to slightly curved pods, slightly raised over and constricted between the seeds. The Gamilaraay peoples know the tree as barranbaa or burrii. It is found in central and coastal Queensland to northern New South Wales. It can reach up to 25 m (82 ft) tall and forms extensive open-forest communities on clay soils.

== Description ==
Acacia harpophylla is a root-suckering tree that typically grows to a height of up to 25 m (82 ft), and has hard, furrowed and almost black bark. Its branchlets are covered with soft hairs, pressed against the surface, or glabrous. Its phyllodes are sickle-shaped, 100–200 mm (3.9–7.9 in) long, 7–20 mm (0.28–0.79 in) wide, leathery and covered with silky hairs, with many closely parallel veins of which three to seven are more prominent than the rest. Its flowers are borne in spherical heads in two to eight racemes on peduncles mostly 10–20 mm (0.39–0.79 in) long and covered with soft hairs. Each head is 5–8 mm (0.20–0.31 in) in diameter with 15 to 35 golden yellow flowers. Flowering occurs between July and October, and the pods are subterete, straight to slightly curved, up to 200 mm (7.9 in) long and 5–10 mm (0.20–0.39 in) wide, crusty and glabrous, slightly raised over and constricted between the seeds. The seeds are oblong or broadly elliptic, flat but thick, 10–18 mm (0.39–0.71 in) long and soft, with a thread-like attachment but no aril.

== Taxonomy ==
Acacia harpophylla was first formally described in 1864 by George Bentham in Flora Australiensis from an unpublished description by Ferdinand von Mueller of specimens collected by Anthelme Thozet near Rockhampton. The specific epithet (harpophylla) refers to the curved phyllodes.

== Distribution and habitat ==
Two species, brigalow (A. harpophylla) and gidgee (A. cambagei) form open woodlands on flat and gently undulating terrain on heavy and relatively fertile clay and clay-loam soils primarily in the 300-700mm annual rainfall region of Eastern Australia. These woodlands extend from a northern extreme of 20° S into northern New South Wales. Brigalow and gidgee occur as mixed communities in some regions and are commonly associated with several other woody species, including overstorey species such as Eucalyptus coolabah, E. cambageana, Casuarina cristata, and a range of understorey species. A. tephrina, A. georginae and A. argyrodendron also occupy similar habitats and have similar habits and growth forms, but are less widespread, while a number of other Acacia species also form structurally similar communities.

Brigalow occurs from coastal regions receiving in excess of 900 mm (35 in) rainfall per year through to the semiarid 500 mm (20 in) rainfall region, though it is primarily a semiarid zone species. Gidgee (A. cambagei) replaces brigalow as rainfall drops in western regions and extends from 650 to 300 mm (26 to 12 in). Gidgee, with a maximum height of approximately 12 m (39 ft), is somewhat smaller than brigalow, which can attain heights of 20 m (66 ft). In the north-western regions black gidgee (A. argyrodendron) replaces brigalow in many areas, while in Central-Western districts boree (A. tephrina) forms woodlands and shrublands, frequently on cracking clay soils and often in association with A. cambagei. Georgina gidgee (A. georginae) woodlands are found in more arid regions in the 200 to 250 mm (7.9 to 9.8 in) rainfall belt.

In New South Wales it is found from around Roto in the south to around Hungerford in the west and Willow Tree in the east along the Great Dividing Range. In Queensland it is found as far north as Townsville.

== Response to fire ==
Species associated with these brigalow communities generally have a good capacity for re-sprouting following fire, and brigalow itself sprouts freely from the butt, roots and living stems in response to fire damage. Both gidgee and blackwood, in contrast, have a limited capacity to resprout following fire damage. A notable exception to the fire tolerance of brigalow communities occurs in what are referred to as softwood scrubs, which are dense communities of brigalow and a range of particularly fire-sensitive species. Fire in any brigalow or gidgee woodland would be a rare event under natural circumstances, since pasture is at best sparse in these communities, consisting of Chloris, Setaria (syn. Paspalidium), Dicanthium, Sporobolus and Eragrostis species.

== Large-scale land clearing ==
In 1962, the Fitzroy Basin Land Development Scheme, also known as the Brigalow Land Development Scheme, was enacted to rapidly clear vast expanses of dominant and co-dominant brigalow ecosystems to make way for agricultural cropping and grazing in brigalow bioregions of Queensland. 4.5Mha was cleared, which accounted for 21% of all brigalow vegetation in Australia. This scheme caused major runoff into catchments. Only 10% of this vegetation remains today (less than 1,000 km^{2} (390 sq mi)) with clearing still continuing at a lesser extent. Brigalow vegetation groups are eligible to be listed as "endangered" under the Australian Government Environment Protection and Biodiversity Conservation Act 1999. The current main threats are continued land clearing for cropping and pasture.

== See also ==
List of Acacia species
