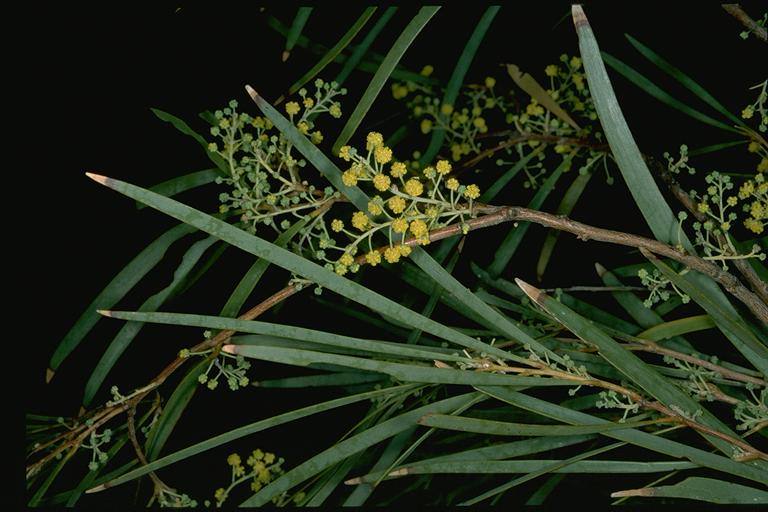
- In Moorrinya National Park

Conservation status
- Least Concern (IUCN 3.1)

Scientific classification
- Kingdom: Plantae
- Clade: Embryophytes
- Clade: Tracheophytes
- Clade: Spermatophytes
- Clade: Angiosperms
- Clade: Eudicots
- Clade: Rosids
- Order: Fabales
- Family: Fabaceae
- Subfamily: Caesalpinioideae
- Clade: Mimosoid clade
- Genus: Acacia
- Species: A. argyrodendron

Binomial name
- Acacia argyrodendron Domin
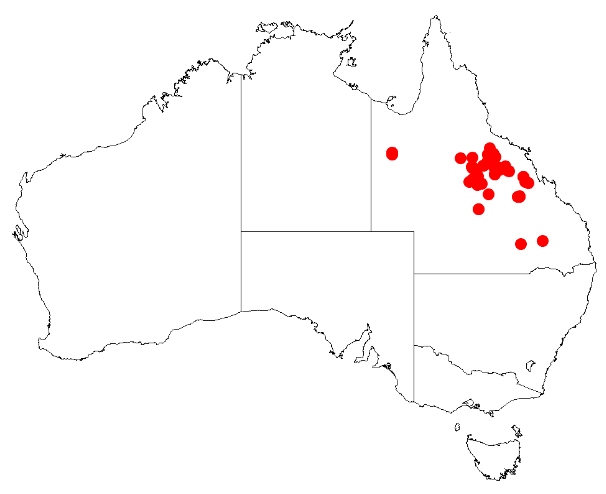
- Occurrence data from AVH

= Acacia argyrodendron =

Black gidyea

Species of legume

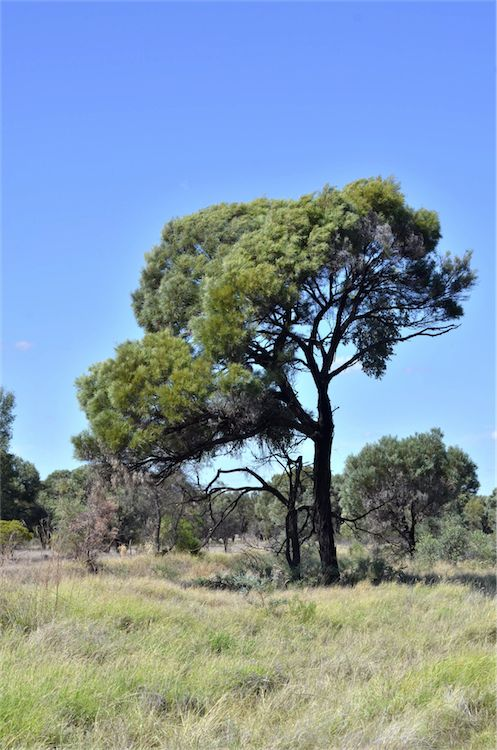
Habit in Forest Den National Park

Acacia argyrodendron, known colloquially as black gidyea or blackwood, is a species of flowering plant in the family Fabaceae and is endemic to Queensland. It is a tree with hard, furrowed bark, narrowly linear to elliptic phyllodes, golden yellow flowers arranged in racemes, and linear pods up to 120 mm (4.7 in) long.

== Description ==
Acacia argyrodendron is a tree that typically grows to 8–25 m (26–82 ft) and has furrowed, dark grey to black bark. Its phyllodes are leathery, upright, narrowly linear to elliptic, 80–170 mm (3.1–6.7 in) long and 4–13 mm (0.16–0.51 in) wide with many closely parallel veins. The flowers are borne in racemes 20–60 mm (0.79–2.36 in) long on a peduncle 5–10 mm (0.20–0.39 in) long in spherical heads about 3.5 mm (0.14 in) in diameter, each head with 12 to 20 golden yellow flowers. Flowering occurs from April to July and the pods are thin, linear, up to 120 mm (4.7 in) and 10–13 mm (0.39–0.51 in) wide containing broadly oblong or elliptic to more or less round or disc-shaped, dull brown seeds 10–13 mm (0.39–0.51 in) long.

== Taxonomy ==
The species was first formally described by the Czech botanist Karel Domin in 1926 in Bibliotheca Botanica. Domin reported that the type specimen was collected from somewhere between Camooweal and Burketown, but Leslie Pedley reports that the species has not been collected in that area since that time. The type collection was made by a Czech geologist, Jeri [George] Vaclav Danes, who travelled between Aramac and Pentland, where he reported open forest consisting mostly of so-called brigalow (black gidya). It is likely that he gave the material to Domin, who cited the place of collection incorrectly.

== Distribution and habitat ==
Acacia argyrodendron is found in central Queensland in the basins of the Cape, Suttor and Belyando Rivers on clay soils in areas where the annual rainfall ranges between 475 and 655 mm (18.7 and 25.8 in). It forms open forests as the dominant (and sometimes only) tree species. Associated understory plants include shrub species such as the false sandalwood (Eremophila mitchellii), yellow-wood (Terminalia oblongata) and conkerberry (Carissa spinarum), and smaller herbaceous plants such as brigalow grass (Paspalidium caespitosum), yakka grass (Sporobolus caroli), blue trumpet (Brunoniella australis) and Dipteracanthus australasicus. Occasionally, there may be trees such as Dawson River blackbutt (Eucalyptus cambageana), coolibah (E. coolabah) and Brown's box (E. brownii).

It has been recorded as a host plant for the mistletoe species Amyema preissii, Amyema quandang and Lysiana exocarpi.

== See also ==
- List of Acacia species
