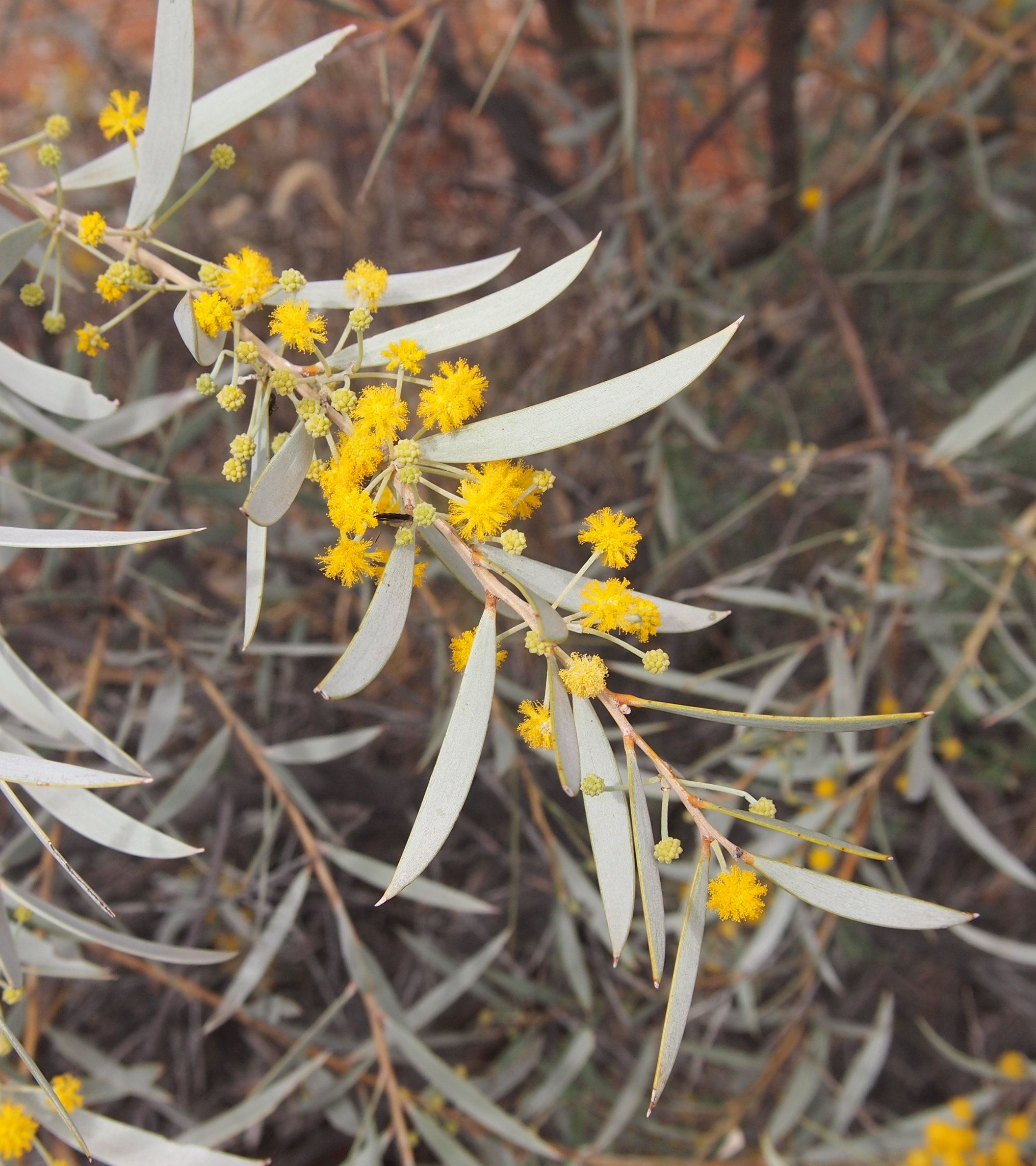

Scientific classification
- Kingdom: Plantae
- Clade: Tracheophytes
- Clade: Angiosperms
- Clade: Eudicots
- Clade: Rosids
- Order: Fabales
- Family: Fabaceae
- Subfamily: Caesalpinioideae
- Clade: Mimosoid clade
- Genus: Acacia
- Species: A. georginae

Binomial name
- Acacia georginae F.M.Bailey
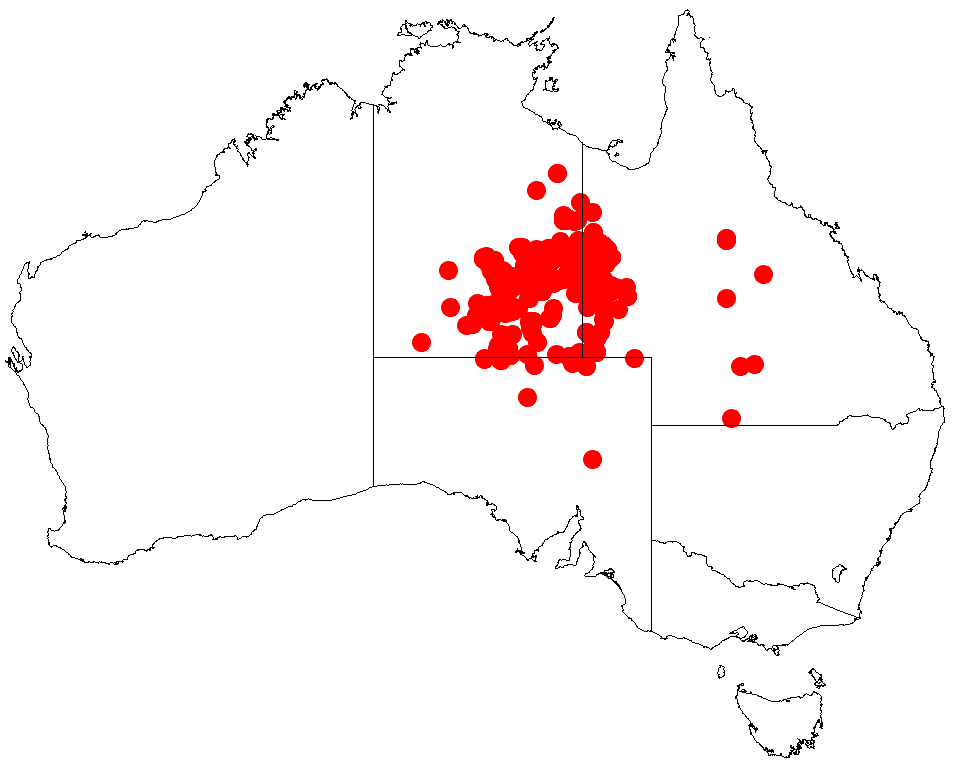
- Occurrence data from AVH

Synonyms
- Racosperma georginae (Bailey) Pedley

= Acacia georginae =

Species of plant

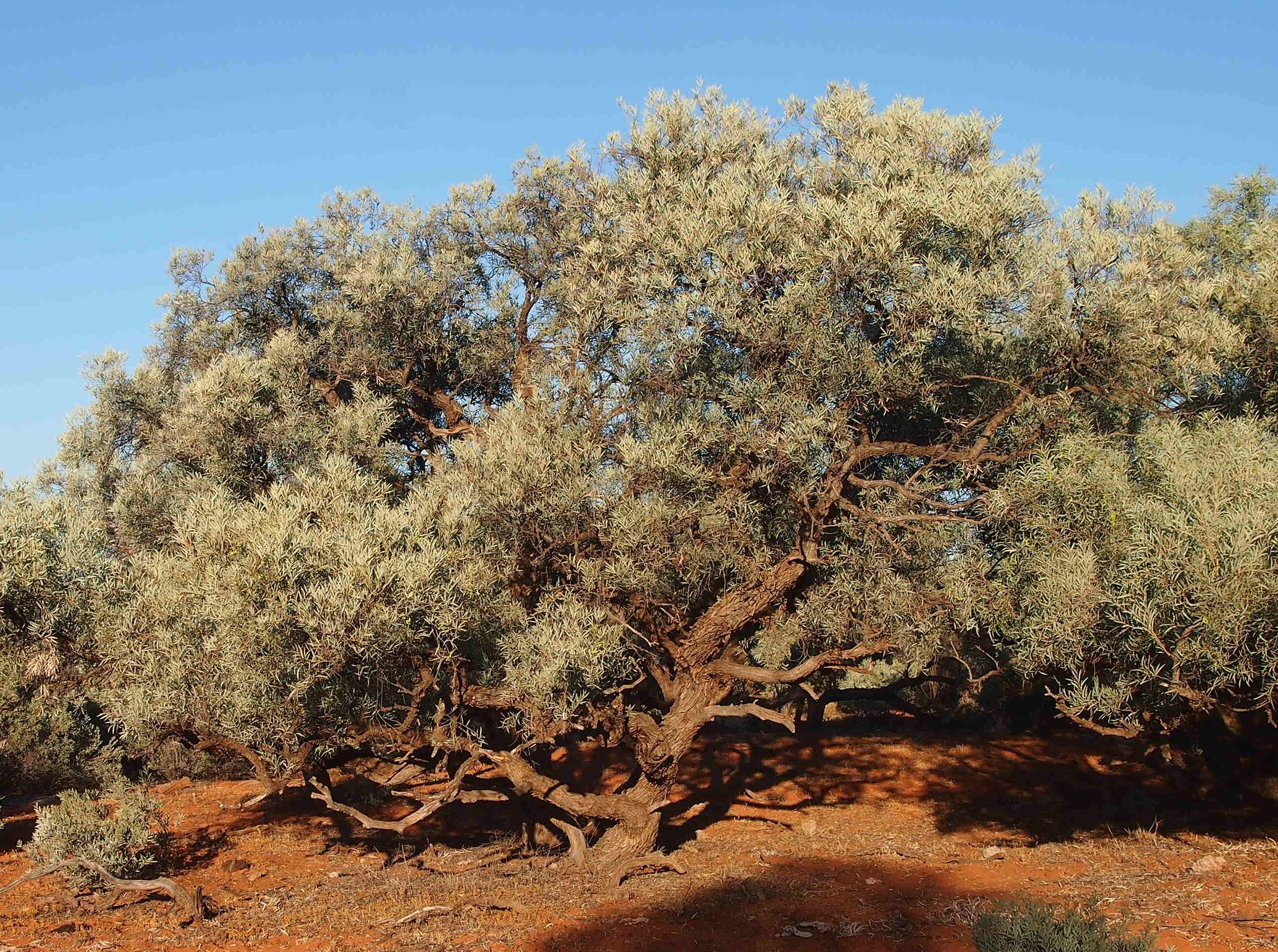
Habit

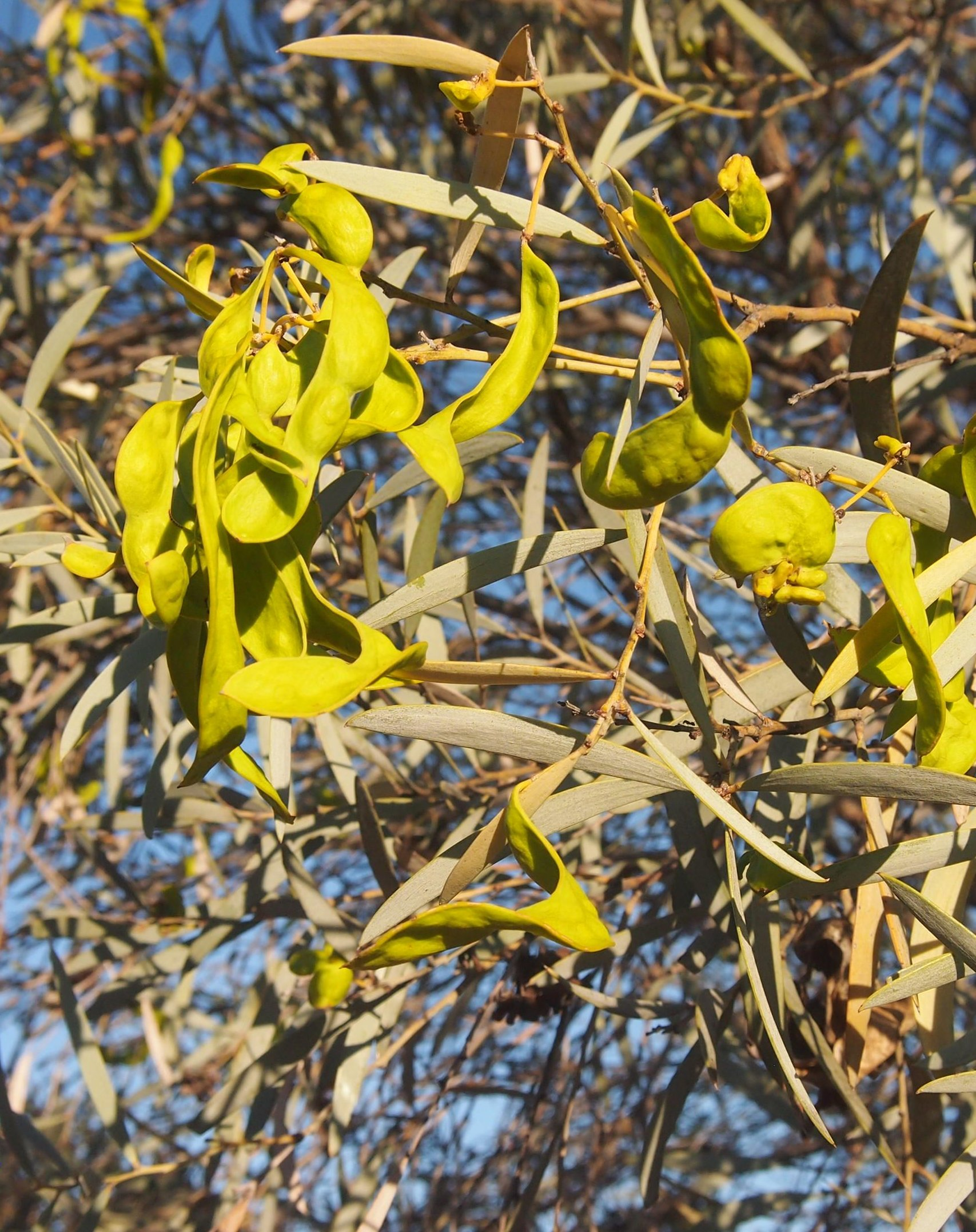
Fruit

Acacia georginae, commonly known as Georgina gidgee, Georgina gidyea or poison gidyea, is a species of flowering plant in the family Fabaceae and is endemic to arid areas of Central Australia. It is a foul-smelling, gnarled or spreading tree with a dense crown, narrowly elliptic phyllodes, spherical heads of golden yellow flowers and curved to coiled, papery pods.

== Description ==
Acacia georginae is a foul-smelling, gnarled or spreading tree that typically grows to a height of 3–8 m (9.8–26.2 ft) and has a dense crown. The branchlets are covered with a white to grey, mealy bloom and a few soft hairs pressed against the surface. Its phyllodes are narrowly elliptic, narrowed at both ends, straight to slightly curved, 40–110 mm (1.6–4.3 in) long and 4–16 mm (0.16–0.63 in) wide, covered with the same bloom as on the branchlets, with up to three prominent veins and many indistinct closely parallel veins. The flowers are borne in five to fifteen spherical heads in racemes 4–8 mm (0.16–0.31 in) long and covered with silky hairs. The heads are on peduncles 7–12 mm (0.28–0.47 in) long, each head 4.0–4.5 mm (0.16–0.18 in) in diameter with 20 to 25 golden yellow flowers. Flowering occurs in most months, and the pods are curved to openly coiled, 60–130 mm (2.4–5.1 in) long, 12–25 mm (0.47–0.98 in) wide, more or less glabrous and papery. The seeds are flat 9–12 mm (0.35–0.47 in) long and dull dark brown.

== Taxonomy ==
Acacia georginae was first formally described in 1896 by Frederick Manson Bailey in the Botany Bulletin. Department of Agriculture, Queensland from specimens collected near the Georgina River. The specific epithet recognizes the place that the type specimen was collected, along the Georgina River.

== Distribution and habitat ==
Georgina gidgee occurs in south-eastern Northern Territory, extending into the Georgina River basin in Queensland and just into the north of South Australia. It grows on plains and along watercourses in clay and loam and is the dominant species in low woodland.

== Conservation status ==
Acacia georginae is listed as of "least concern" under the Northern Territory Territory Parks and Wildlife Conservation Act and the Queensland Government Nature Conservation Act 1992.

== Toxicity ==
Acacia georginae is closely related to A. cambagei, but unlike that species, its foliage contains fluoroacetic acid that is extremely poisonous to livestock. The foul smelling odour of the phyllodes that is especially evident in wet weather, is also a characteristic of A. cambagei and A. pachcarpa.

== See also ==
- List of Acacia species
