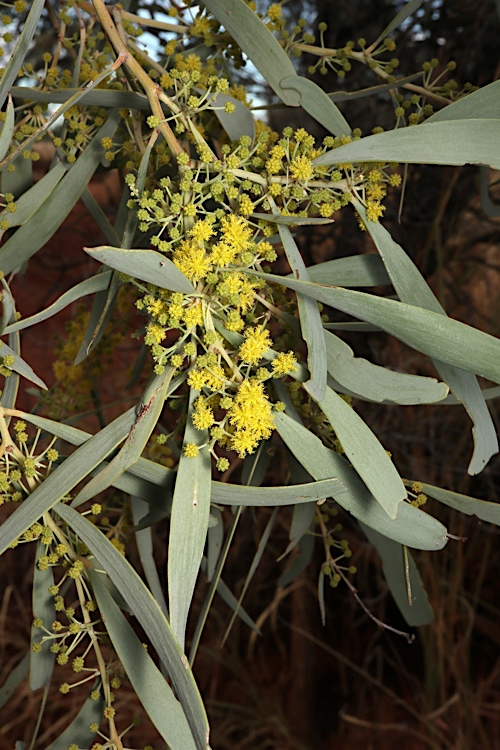

Conservation status
- Least Concern (IUCN 3.1)

Scientific classification
- Kingdom: Plantae
- Clade: Tracheophytes
- Clade: Angiosperms
- Clade: Eudicots
- Clade: Rosids
- Order: Fabales
- Family: Fabaceae
- Subfamily: Caesalpinioideae
- Clade: Mimosoid clade
- Genus: Acacia
- Species: A. cambagei

Binomial name
- Acacia cambagei R.T.Baker
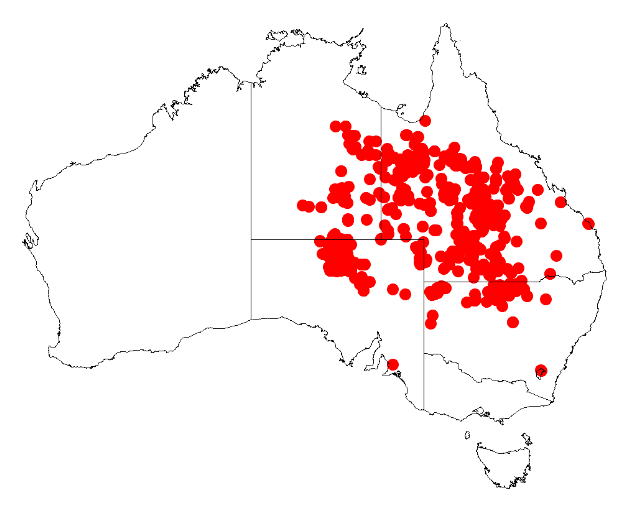
- Occurrence data from AVH

Synonyms
- Racosperma cambagei (R.T.Baker) Pedley; Acacia georginae auct. non F.M.Bailey: Domin, K. (October 1926)

= Acacia cambagei =

Gidgee

Species of plant

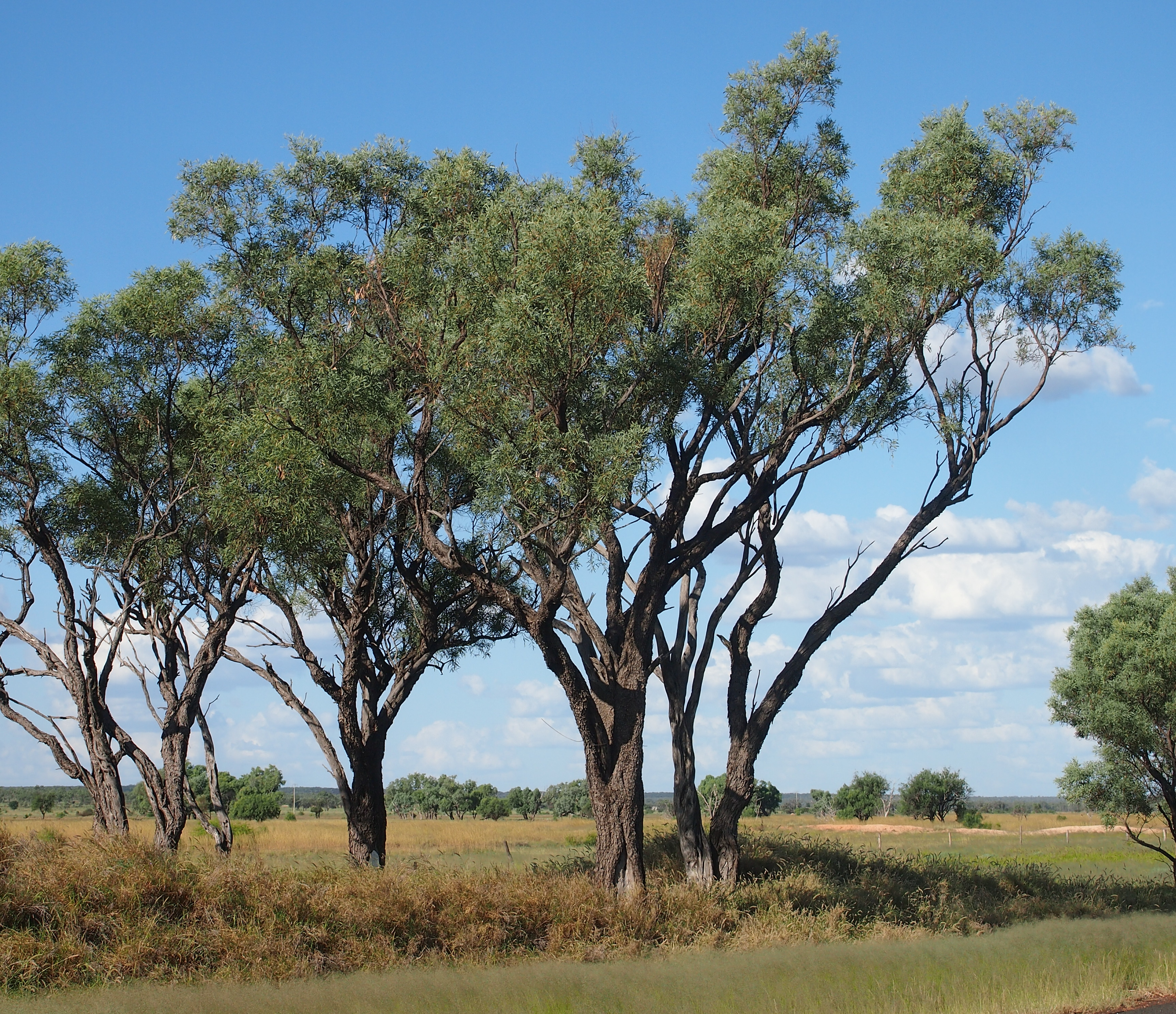
Habit

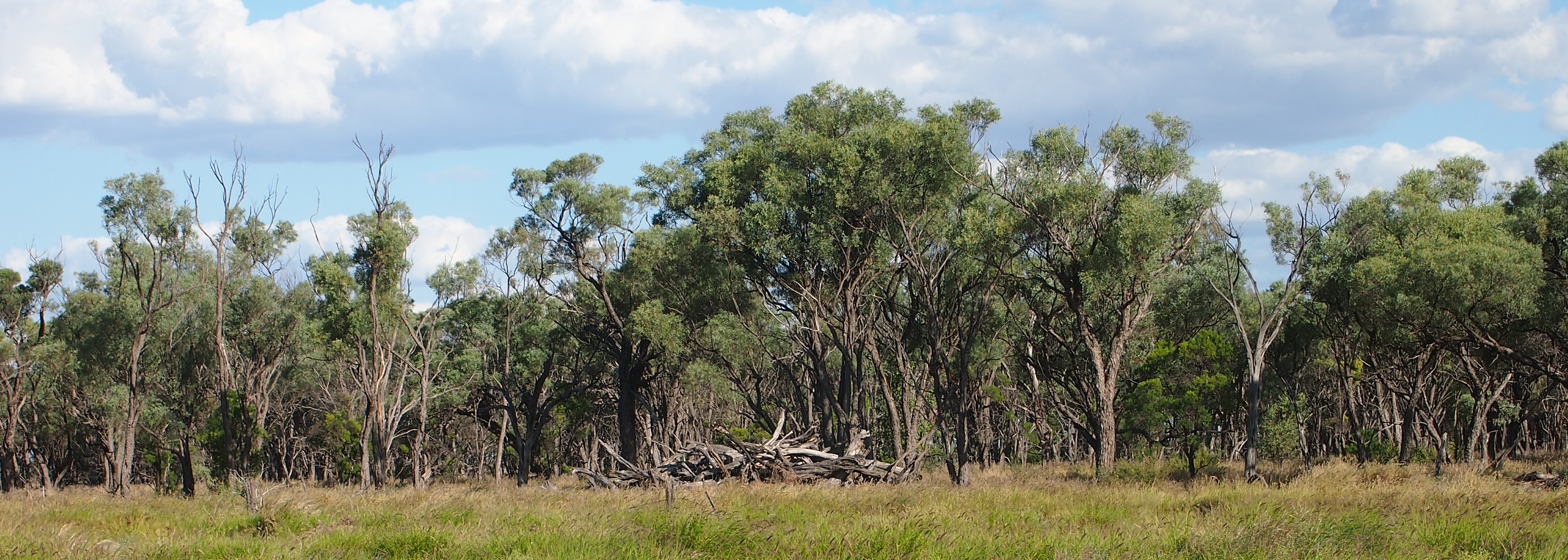
Gidgee woodland

Acacia cambagei, commonly known as gidgee, gidyea, gidya, gidgea or stinking wattle is a species of flowering plant in the family Fabaceae and is endemic to north-eastern Australia. It is a spreading, foul-smelling tree with narrowly elliptic to linear phyllodes, spherical heads of golden yellow flowers, and narrowly oblong, papery pods up to 130 mm (5.1 in) long.

== Description ==
Acacia cambagei is a spreading, foul-smelling tree that typically grows to a height of 4–15 m (13–49 ft), has a moderately dense crown and dark grey, flaky bark. Its phyllodes are narrowly elliptic to linear, narrowed at both ends, leathery, 40–140 mm (1.6–5.5 in) long and 3–10 mm (0.12–0.39 in) wide with one to three prominent veins and many indistinct parallel ones. The flowers are borne in ten to twenty spherical heads in racemes 2–9 mm (0.079–0.354 in) long on peduncles 4–10 mm (0.16–0.39 in) long. Each head is 3–5 mm (0.12–0.20 in) in diameter and has 12 to 25 golden yellow flowers. The pods are narrowly oblong, papery and more or less straight, up to 130 mm (5.1 in) long and 8–12 mm (0.31–0.47 in) wide containing dark brown, broadly elliptic to oblong, flattened seeds 5–9 mm (0.20–0.35 in) long.

== Taxonomy ==
Acacia cambagei was first formally described in 1901 by Richard Baker in Proceedings of the Linnean Society of New South Wales from specimens collected between "Bourke and northward to Queensland" by Richard Cambage.

== Distribution and habitat ==
Gidgee is found in arid and semi-arid areas of eastern Australia, from central areas of the Northern Territory, north-eastern South Australia, central Queensland and north-western New South Wales.

Confined to regions between 550 and 200 mm annual rainfall, A. cambagei is found primarily on flat and gently undulating terrain on heavy and relatively fertile clay and clay-loam soils in the eastern part of it range, and often forms mixed communities with brigalow which favours the same soil types. In drier regions, gidgee is found primarily on red earths and loams in wetter depression and low-relief areas. Gidgee communities are floristically similar to brigalow communities. Eucalyptus cambageana, E. populnea, Corymbia terminalis, Eremophila mitchellii and Geijera parviflora are typical woody species associated with gidgee communities.

Species associated with gidgee have a limited capacity to resprout following fire damage. Fire in any gidgee woodland would be a rare event under natural circumstances, since pasture is at best sparse in these communities, consisting of Chloris, Setaria (syn. Paspalidium), Dicanthium, Sporobolus and Eragrostis species.

== See also ==
- List of Acacia species
