= B. acaulis =

B. acaulis may refer to:

- Brassavola acaulis, an orchid species in the genus Brassavola
- Brunoniella acaulis, a plant species in the genus Brunoniella found in Australia
