= Acacia pachycarpa =

Scientific classification
- Kingdom: Plantae
- Clade: Tracheophytes
- Clade: Angiosperms
- Clade: Eudicots
- Clade: Rosids
- Order: Fabales
- Family: Fabaceae
- Subfamily: Caesalpinioideae
- Clade: Mimosoid clade
- Genus: Acacia
- Species: A. pachycarpa

Binomial name
- Acacia pachycarpa F.Muell. ex Benth.
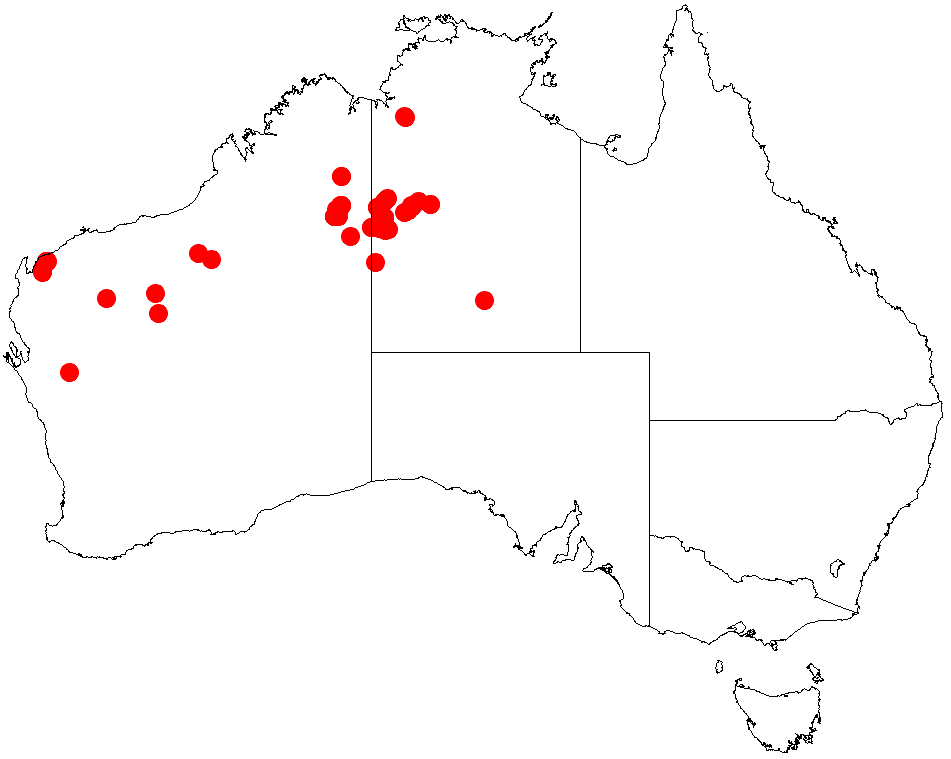
- Occurrence data from AVH

Synonyms
- Acacia crassifrugis Mary Tindale & Maconochie; Acacia pachycarpa F.Muell. nom. inval., pro syn.; Racosperma pachycarpum (F.Muell. ex Benth.) Pedley

Species of legume

Acacia pachycarpa is a species of flowering plant in the family Fabaceae, and is endemic to central and northern parts of Western Australia and nearby parts of the Northern Territory. It is a shrubby tree with a weeping habit, glabrous branchlets, broadly linear to very narrowly elliptic, more or less sickle-shaped phyllodes, spikes of cream-coloured flowers and narrowly oblong, woody pods.

== Description ==
Acacia pachycarpa is a shrubby tree with a weeping habit and that typically grows to a height of 3–6 m (9.8–19.7 ft) and has hard, dark grey, furrowed bark on the main stems, and glabrous branchlets. Its phyllodes are broadly linear to very narrowly elliptic, more or less sickle-shaped, 130–340 mm (5.1–13.4 in) long, 6–20 mm (0.24–0.79 in) wide, leathery, glabrous and with up to five main veins. The flowers are cream-coloured and borne in one or two spikes 30–60 mm (1.2–2.4 in) long and about 10 mm (0.39 in) in diameter in axils on peduncles 2–22 mm (0.079–0.866 in) long. Flowering occurs from May to June, and the pods are narrowly oblong, biconvex, up to 150 mm (5.9 in) long, 20 mm (0.79 in) wide, woody, glabrous, wrinkled and shiny yellowish brown. The seeds are broadly elliptic, 5–9 mm (0.20–0.35 in) long and dull brown, without an obvious aril.

== Taxonomy ==
Acacia pachycarpa was first formally described in 1864 by George Bentham in his Flora Australiensis from an unpublished description of Ferdinand von Mueller of specimens he collected near "Sturt's Creek in Northern Australia." The specific epithet (pachycarpa) means 'thick fruit', referring to the woody pods.

== Distribution ==
This species of wattle commonly grows along drainage lines in clay depressions and clay pans, but also in sandy alluvium along creeks and in sandy loam, mainly in the Tanami Desert and nearby west-central Northern Territory where it often forms single-species communities. There are also scattered populations near the Telfer mine and Minderoo Station.

== See also ==
- List of Acacia species
