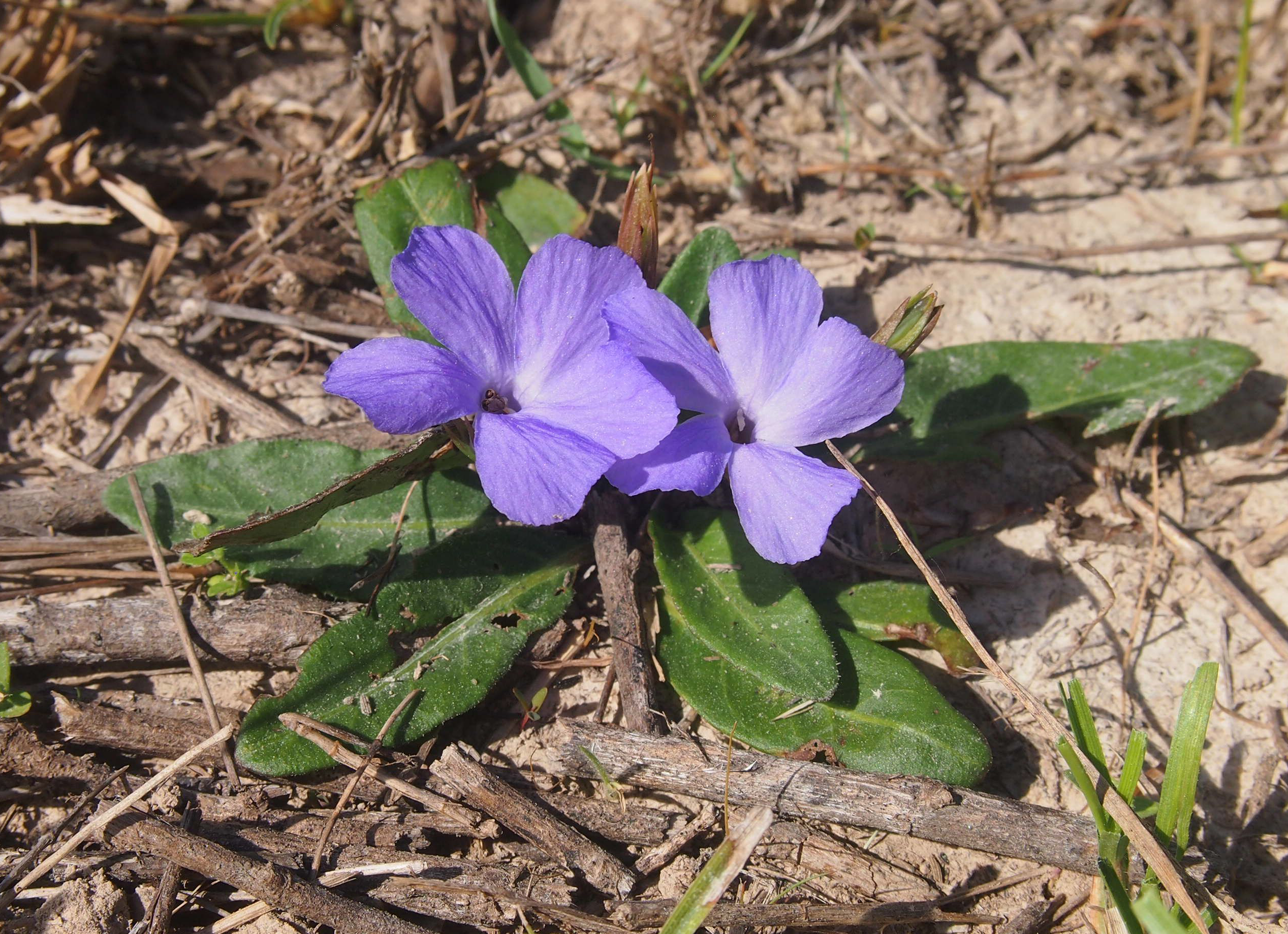

Scientific classification
- Kingdom: Plantae
- Clade: Tracheophytes
- Clade: Angiosperms
- Clade: Eudicots
- Clade: Asterids
- Order: Lamiales
- Family: Acanthaceae
- Genus: Brunoniella
- Species: B. australis

Binomial name
- Brunoniella australis (Cav.) Bremek.

Synonyms
- Cryphiacanthus australis (Cav.) Nees; Dipteracanthus australis (Cav.) Hassk.; Ruellia australis Cav.

= Brunoniella australis =

Species of flowering plant

Brunoniella australis, the blue trumpet or blue yam, is a plant native of Australia. A widespread herbaceous plant, found in moist areas of eucalyptus woodland and forest, particularly on sloping ground. It is a small plant between 2–30 cm (0.8–10 in) tall.
