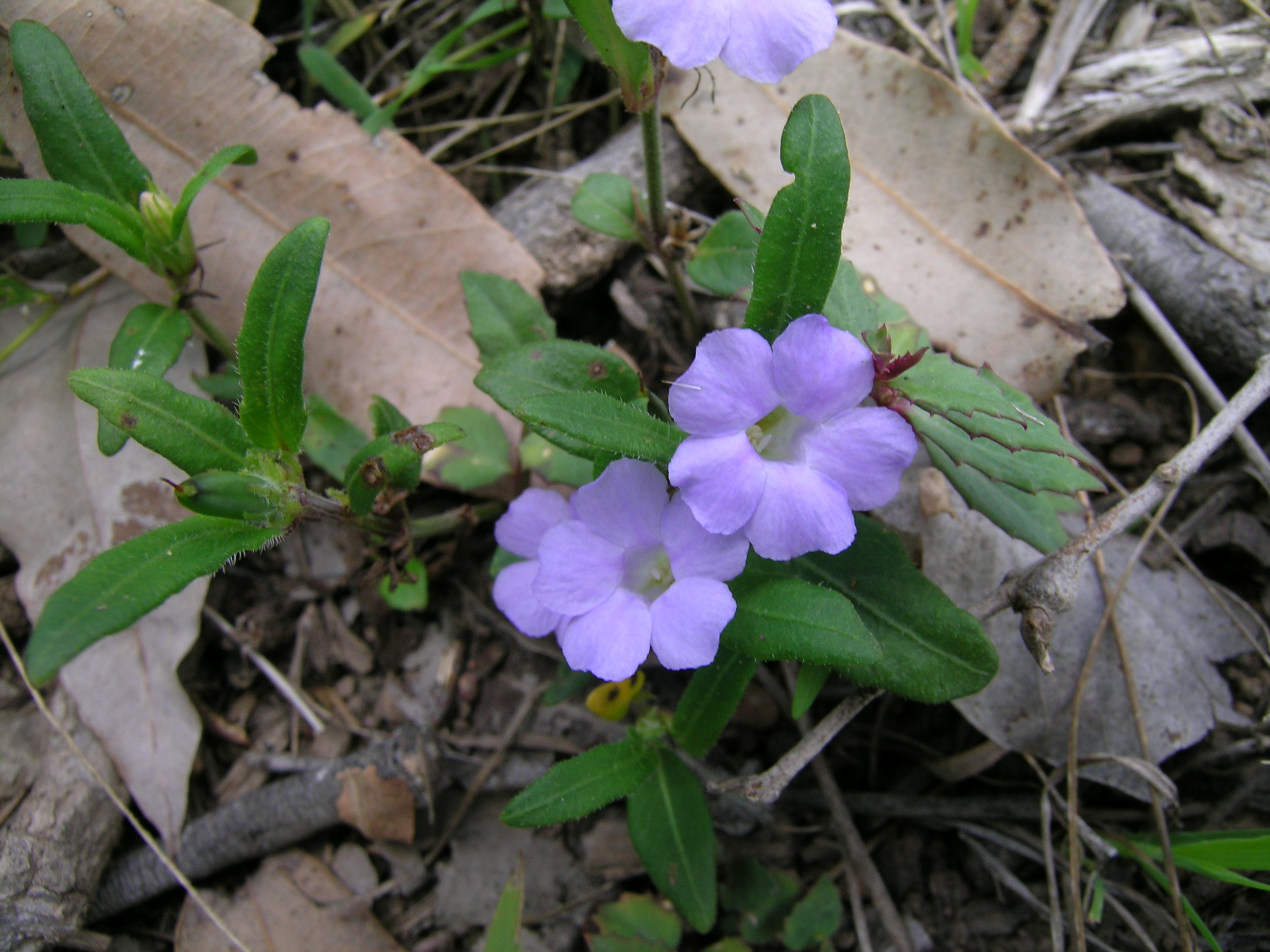
- Brunoniella australis

Scientific classification
- Kingdom: Plantae
- Clade: Tracheophytes
- Clade: Angiosperms
- Clade: Eudicots
- Clade: Asterids
- Order: Lamiales
- Family: Acanthaceae
- Genus: Brunoniella; Bremek. (1964)

Species
- Brunoniella acaulis (R.Br.) Bremek.; Brunoniella australis (Cav.) Bremek.; Brunoniella linearifolia R.M.Barker; † Brunoniella neocaledonica (Heine) Moylan; Brunoniella pumilio (R.Br.) Bremek.; Brunoniella spiciflora (F.Muell. ex Benth.) Bremek.

= Brunoniella =

Genus of flowering plants

Brunoniella is a genus of flowering plants in the family Acanthaceae. It includes six species native to Australia and New Caledonia.

== Species ==
Six species are accepted:

- Brunoniella acaulis (R.Br.) Bremek. – northern Australia (Western Australia, Northern Territory, and Queensland)
- Brunoniella australis (Cav.) Bremek. – northern and eastern Australia (Northern Territory, Queensland, and New South Wales)
- Brunoniella linearifolia R.M.Barker – Northern Territory
- † Brunoniella neocaledonica (Heine) Moylan – northwestern New Caledonia
- Brunoniella pumilio (R.Br.) Bremek. – Northern Territory, New South Wales, possibly Queensland
- Brunoniella spiciflora (F.Muell. ex Benth.) Bremek. – Queensland
