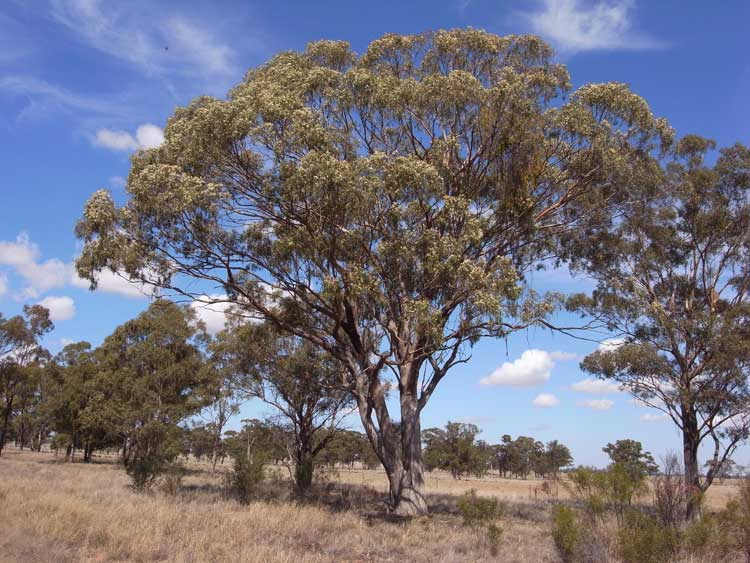
- Eucalyptus pilligaensis near Gilgandra

Scientific classification
- Kingdom: Plantae
- Clade: Tracheophytes
- Clade: Angiosperms
- Clade: Eudicots
- Clade: Rosids
- Order: Myrtales
- Family: Myrtaceae
- Genus: Eucalyptus
- Species: E. pilligaensis

Binomial name
- Eucalyptus pilligaensis Maiden

= Eucalyptus pilligaensis =

Pillaga box

Species of eucalyptus

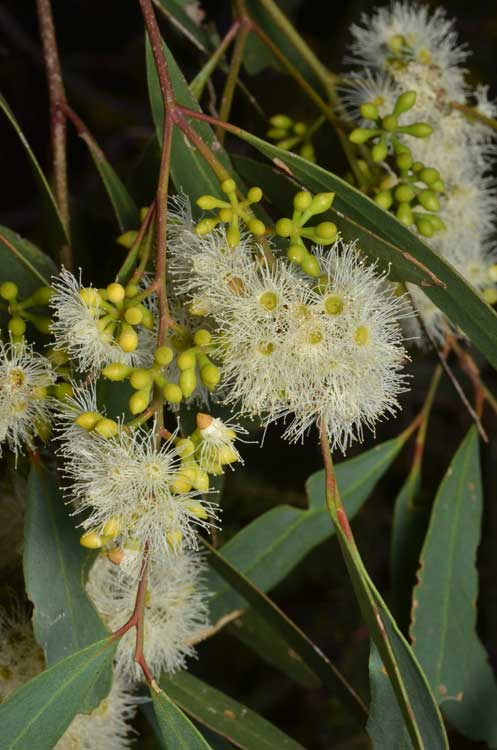
flower buds and flowers

Eucalyptus pilligaensis, commonly known as the Pilliga box or narrow-leaved box, is a species of eucalypt native to eastern Australia.

== Taxonomy ==
Eucalyptus pilligaensis was first formally described in 1920 by Joseph Maiden in Journal and Proceedings of the Royal Society of New South Wales. It is regarded as a synonym of Eucalyptus woollsiana by the Australian Plant Census.
