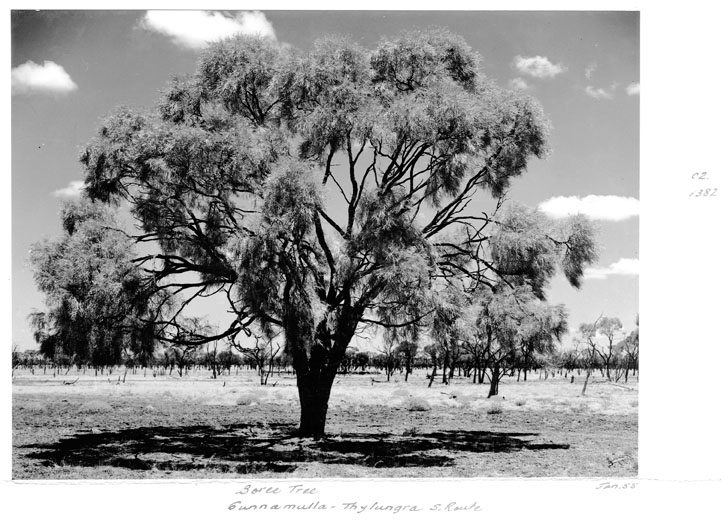
- Boree tree between Thylungra and Cunnamulla in 1955

Scientific classification
- Kingdom: Plantae
- Clade: Tracheophytes
- Clade: Angiosperms
- Clade: Eudicots
- Clade: Rosids
- Order: Fabales
- Family: Fabaceae
- Subfamily: Caesalpinioideae
- Clade: Mimosoid clade
- Genus: Acacia
- Species: A. tephrina

Binomial name
- Acacia tephrina Pedley
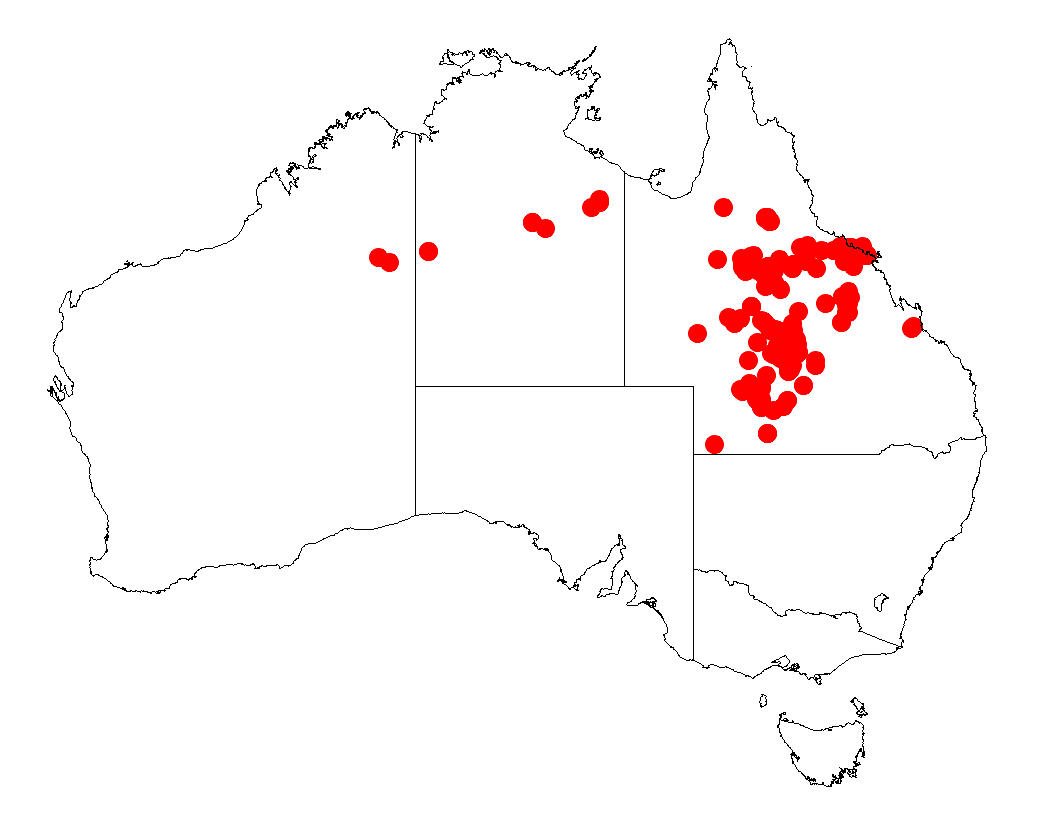
- Occurrence data from AVH

= Acacia tephrina =

Boree

Species of legume

Acacia tephrina, commonly known as boree, is a tree of the genus Acacia and the subgenus Plurinerves that is endemic to an area of north eastern Australia. It is rated as being of least concern according to Nature Conservation Act 1992.

== Description ==
The tree can grow to a maximum height of around 20 m (66 ft) and has flaky and fissured dark grey coloured bark with grey-green densely haired branchlets. It has an erect, open and narrow crown and usually branches pretty close to the ground on the trunk. It can be coppiced and is able to produce suckers. Like most species of Acacia it has phyllodes rather than true leaves. The evergreen hairy phyllodes have a linear shape and are straight to slightly recurved with a length of 7 to 15 cm (2.8 to 5.9 in) and a width of 2 to 6 mm (0.079 to 0.236 in) and have many fine, closely parallel nerves. When it blooms it produces inflorescences that appear in groups of two to ten across a raceme with a length of 1 to 8 mm (0.039 to 0.315 in) with spherical flower-heads that have a diameter of about 4.5 mm (0.18 in) and contain 20 to 35 golden coloured flowers. Following flowering hairy and leathery seed pods form that have a linear shape with straight edges and are quite flat and barely raised over each of the seeds. The pods have a length up to about 6.5 cm (2.6 in) and a width of 5 to 6 mm (0.20 to 0.24 in) with an obvious marginal nerve and contain longitudinally arranged seeds that are 5.5 mm (0.22 in) in length with a small aril.

== Taxonomy ==
The species was first formally described by the botanist Leslie Pedley in 1981 as a part of the work Further notes on Acacia in Queensland as published in the journal Austrobaileya. Pedley the reclassified the tree as Racosperma tephrinum in 1987 then it was transferred back to genus Acacia in 2001. It is closely related to Acacia maconochieana and is similar in appearance to Acacia cana which it is often confused with. The type specimen was collected to the north oh Hughenden by M.Lazarides in 1953.

== Distribution ==
It is native to an area of far eastern Northern Territory and central and southern Queensland with a disjunct distribution extending from around Cresswell on the Barkly Tableland of the Northern Territory in the west and into Queensland mostly to the western side of the Great Dividing Range with a range extending from Einasleigh in the north down to Cunnamulla in the south and out to around Bowen in the north east. It is found growing in heavy soils, including saline clay soils and as a part of open tall woodland or low woodland and shrubland communities.

== Cultivation ==
It will grow well in an open sunny position in a well-drained medium to heavy soil, but is able to tolerate seasonal inundations and infertile soils containing moderate salt levels that are slightly acidic to quite alkaline. Fertility is low. It is reasonably slow growing but is long-lived and some trees reach over 50 years in age. It can be planted in light shade and shelter. Prior to planting, seeds should be soaked or scarified.

== Uses ==
The tree produces a hard and heavy dark red-brown coloured wood that is ideal to be used in rails, posts, and poles, it also makes great firewood that combusts when green or dry producing an intense heat. The bark contains tannins and are astringent and used by Indigenous Australians to treat diarrhoea and dysentery when taken or used as a wash to treat wounds or skin or eye problems.

== See also ==
- List of Acacia species
