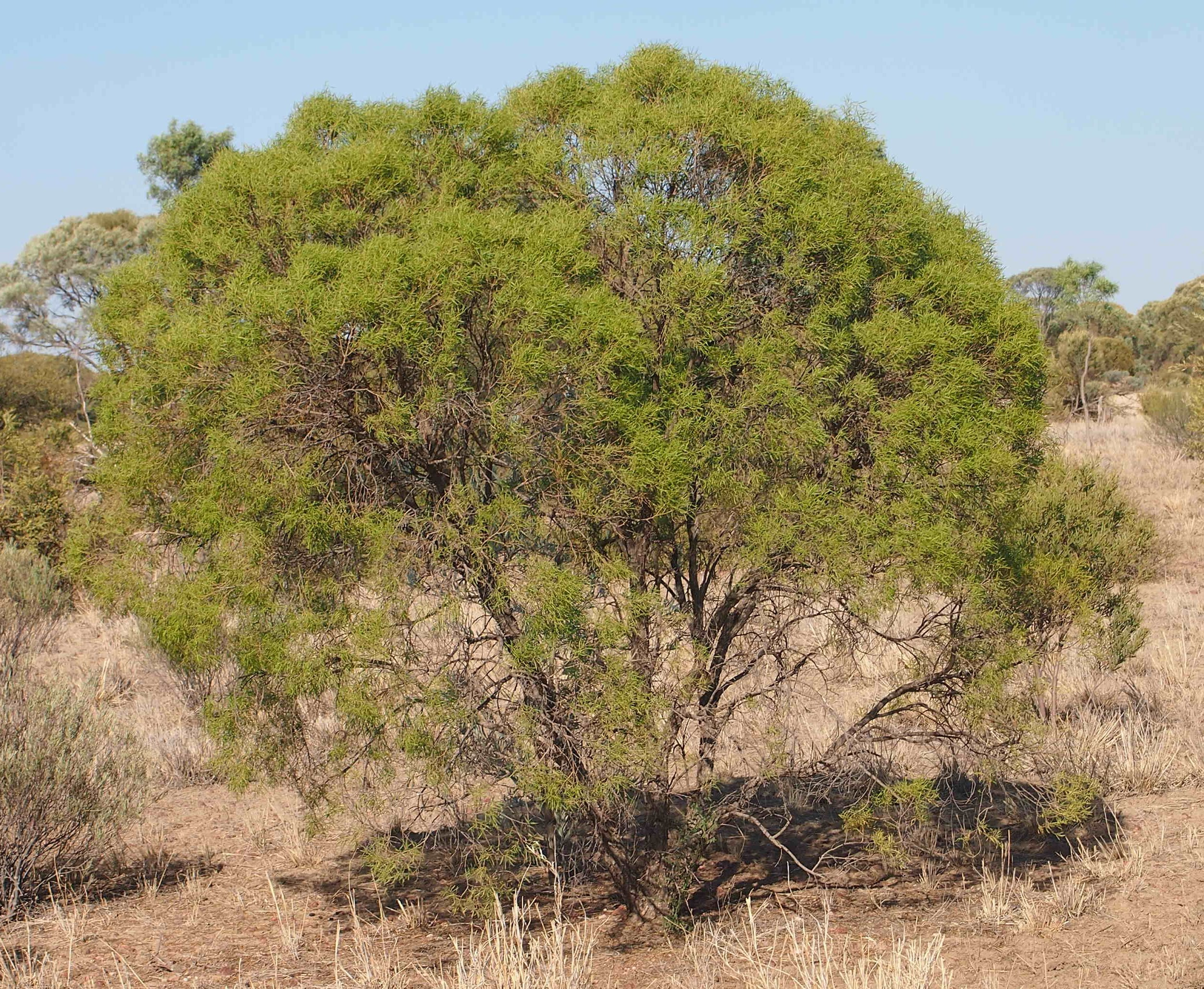
- Eremophila mitchellii habit

Scientific classification
- Kingdom: Plantae
- Clade: Tracheophytes
- Clade: Angiosperms
- Clade: Eudicots
- Clade: Asterids
- Order: Lamiales
- Family: Scrophulariaceae
- Genus: Eremophila
- Species: E. mitchellii

Binomial name
- Eremophila mitchellii Benth.

Synonyms
- Bondtia mitchelli Kuntze orth. var.; Bontia mitchellii (Benth.) Kuntze; Eremophila mitchelli Benth. orth. var.; Pholidia mitchelli Wettst. orth. var.; Pholidia mitchellii (Benth.) Wettst.

= Eremophila mitchellii =

False sandalwood

Species of flowering plant

Eremophila mitchellii, known commonly as false sandalwood and several other names, is a flowering plant in the figwort family, Scrophulariaceae and is endemic to Australia. It is a glabrous large shrub or small tree with flaky bark, white or cream-coloured flowers and is capable of root suckering. It is widespread and common in New South Wales and Queensland where it is a serious pest of grazing land. Essential oils from the plant have been shown to have valuable properties and have been commercially exploited.

== Description ==
Eremophila mitchellii is a glabrous large shrub with a few main stems, or small tree which sometimes grows to a height of 10 m (30 ft) high although more regularly in the range 2 to 6 m (7 to 20 ft). It has light grey bark which often flakes into small pieces, sometimes curling at the edges. The branches and leaves are glabrous and some parts are often sticky due to the presence of resin and the leaves are aromatic when crushed. The leaves are arranged alternately along the branches and are linear to lance-shaped, mostly 24–55 mm (0.9–2 in) long, 2–5.5 mm (0.08–0.2 in) wide, slightly sticky, have a distinct mid-vein on the lower surface and often have a hooked tip.

The flowers are borne in groups of 2 or 3 in leaf axils on glabrous, sticky stalks 4.5–7 mm (0.2–0.3 in) long. There are 5 white to cream-coloured, sometimes pinkish sepals which are lance-shaped with a rounded end and mostly 4–9.5 mm (0.2–0.4 in) long. The petals are 10–18 mm (0.4–0.7 in) long and joined at their lower end to form a tube. The petal tube is usually white or cream-coloured, sometimes pale pink and has spots inside the tube. The petal tube is mostly glabrous except for the inside of the tube which is filled with long soft hairs. Two of the stamens are fully enclosed in the tube while the other two sometimes extend slightly past its end. Flowering mainly occurs mainly from September to November, sometimes earlier and is followed by fruits which are oval-shaped, usually 4–7 mm (0.2–0.3 in) long and have a crusty covering.

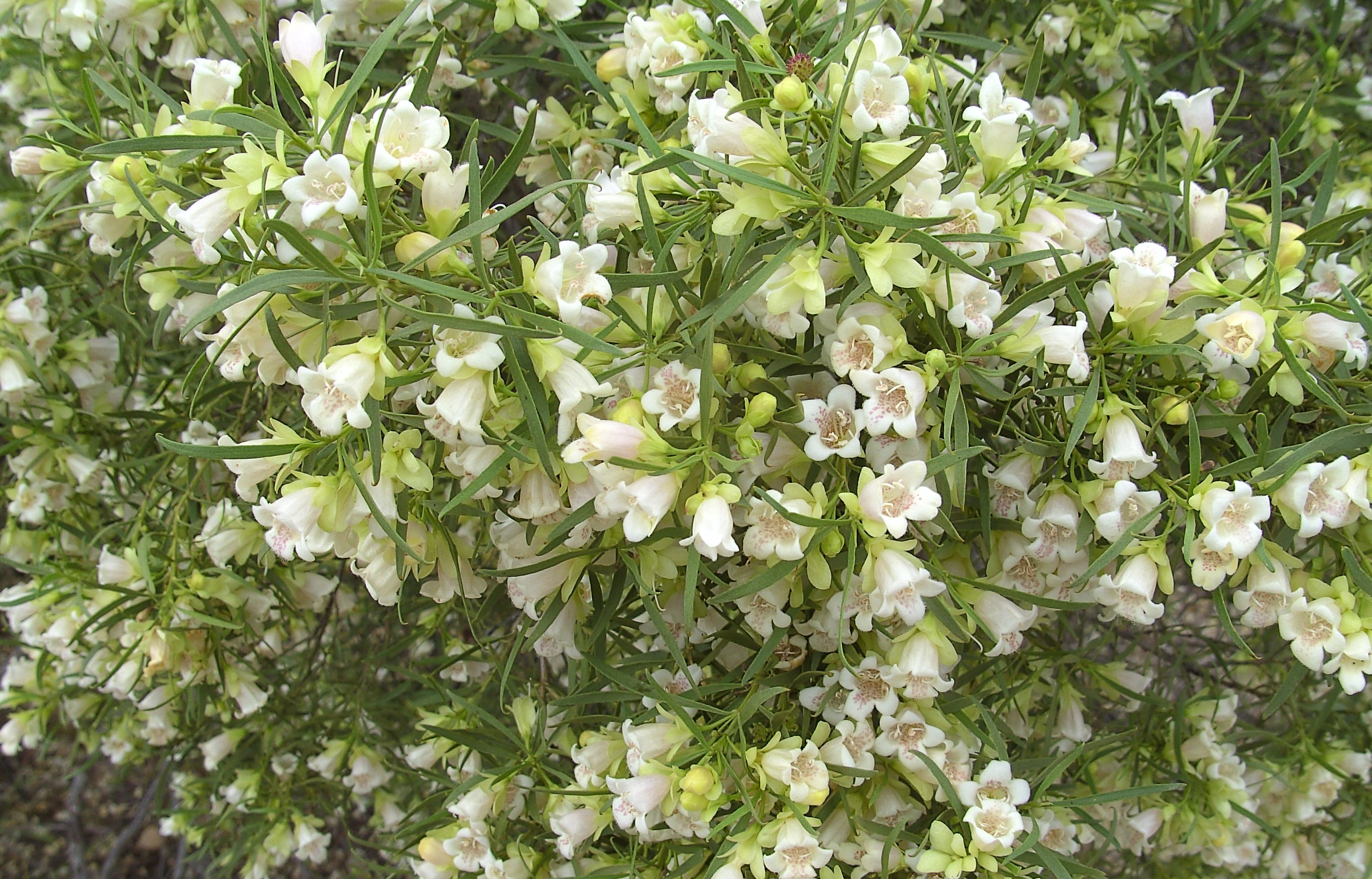
E. mitchellii flowers and foliage near Bourke after rain.

== Taxonomy and naming ==
The species was first formally described in 1848 by the botanist George Bentham and the description was published in Journal of an Expedition into the Interior of Tropical Australia. The specific epithet (mitchellii) honours the explorer and surveyor, Thomas Mitchell.

Other common names applied to this species include buddah, buddha, budtha, sandalwood, native sandalwood, false sandalwood, bastard sandalwood, sandalbox and rosewood balvory.

== Distribution and habitat ==
False sandalwood is found to the west of the Great Dividing Range and north of Hillston in New South Wales and in eastern Queensland where it grows in a range of soils and is common in most types of woodland.

== Ecology ==
This species invades pasture land in New South Wales and Queensland and its cultivation is prohibited in Western Australia. The plant quickly regrows from roots remaining in the ground after clearing and rapidly invades from seeds. Native scale insects from the genus Pulvinaria (Hemiptera:Coccidae) have been shown to be able to kill E. mitchellii but need to be physically applied to the plant.

== Uses ==
=== Indigenous use ===
Aboriginal people used false sandalwood to treat rheumatism and the smoke from burning the leaves for general medicinal purposes.

=== Essential oils ===
False sandalwood contains essential oils including bicyclic sesquiterpenes known as eremophilanes. The oil is extracted by steam distillation and has been used as a mild analgesic and as an aromatic additive in toiletries. It is active against some pathogenic microorganisms including Staphylococcus aureus, Salmonella typhimurium and Candida albicans when undiluted and against Salmonella at a concentration of 1%. The oil is also an effective termiticide which has been marketed as Termilone.

=== Horticulture ===
Eremophila mitchellii is not widely cultivated but may be suited for dry climates in full sun and well-drained soil.

=== Wood ===
The timber from false sandalwood is suited for woodturning, although it is very hard, and it retains a pleasant scent for a long time, even after sealing. Its oil content allows it to be polished to a high gloss.

=== Uses ===
Joseph Maiden's 1889 book The Useful Native Plants of Australia records that "The leaves are eaten by stock. The seeds of several species are eaten by emus."
