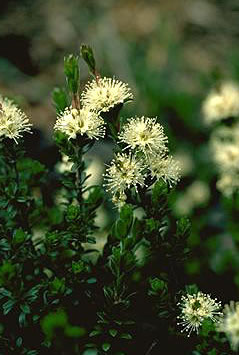

Conservation status
- Vulnerable (EPBC Act)

Scientific classification
- Kingdom: Plantae
- Clade: Tracheophytes
- Clade: Angiosperms
- Clade: Eudicots
- Clade: Rosids
- Order: Myrtales
- Family: Myrtaceae
- Genus: Kunzea
- Species: K. cambagei

Binomial name
- Kunzea cambagei Maiden & Betche

= Kunzea cambagei =

Species of flowering plant

Kunzea cambagei, commonly known as the Cambage kunzea is a flowering plant in the myrtle family, Myrtaceae and is endemic to a small area of New South Wales. It is a small shrub with egg-shaped leaves and clusters of cream-coloured to yellowish flowers near the end of the branches. It is only known from areas near Mount Werong in the Kanangra-Boyd National Park and Berrima.

== Description ==
Kunzea cambagei is a shrub which grows to a height of about 0.6 m (2 ft) with its branches silky-hairy when young. The leaves are arranged alternately along the branches, elliptic to egg-shaped with the narrower end towards the base, 3–8 mm (0.1–0.3 in) long and 1.5–3 mm (0.06–0.1 in) wide with a petiole about 0.5 mm (0.02 in) long. The flowers are cream-coloured to yellowish and arranged in rounded groups of five to thirteen near the ends of the branches. The floral cup is silky-hairy and about 3 mm (0.1 in) long. The sepal lobes are triangular, about 1 mm (0.04 in) long and the petals are white, 1.0–1.5 mm (0.04–0.06 in) long. There are about 20-25 stamens which are 2–3 mm (0.08–0.1 in) long. Flowering occurs in October and November and the fruit are cup-shaped capsules which are 3 mm (0.1 in) long and about 1.5 mm (0.06 in) wide.

== Taxonomy and naming ==
Kunzea cambagei was first formally described in 1913 by Joseph Maiden and Ernst Betche from a specimen collected by Richard Hind Cambage. The description was published in Proceedings of the Linnean Society of New South Wales. The specific epithet (cambagei) honours the collector of the type specimen.

== Distribution and habitat ==
The Cambage kunzea grows in moist heath mainly on the Central Tablelands of New South Wales.

== Conservation ==
Kunzea cambagei is listed as "Vulnerable" under the Commonwealth Government Environment Protection and Biodiversity Conservation Act 1999 (EPBC) Act and as "Vulnerable" under the New South Wales Threatened Species Conservation Act 1995. The main threats to the species are inappropriate fire regimes and habitat degradation caused by road widening, rubbish dumping and trail bikes.
