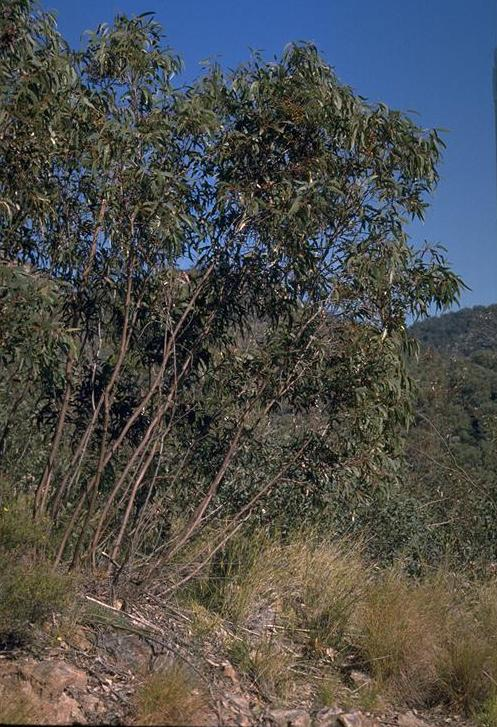
- Eucalyptus pumila at Pokolbin

Conservation status
- Vulnerable (IUCN 3.1)

- Vulnerable (EPBC Act)

Scientific classification
- Kingdom: Plantae
- Clade: Tracheophytes
- Clade: Angiosperms
- Clade: Eudicots
- Clade: Rosids
- Order: Myrtales
- Family: Myrtaceae
- Genus: Eucalyptus
- Species: E. pumila

Binomial name
- Eucalyptus pumila Cambage

= Eucalyptus pumila =

Pokolbin mallee

Species of eucalyptus

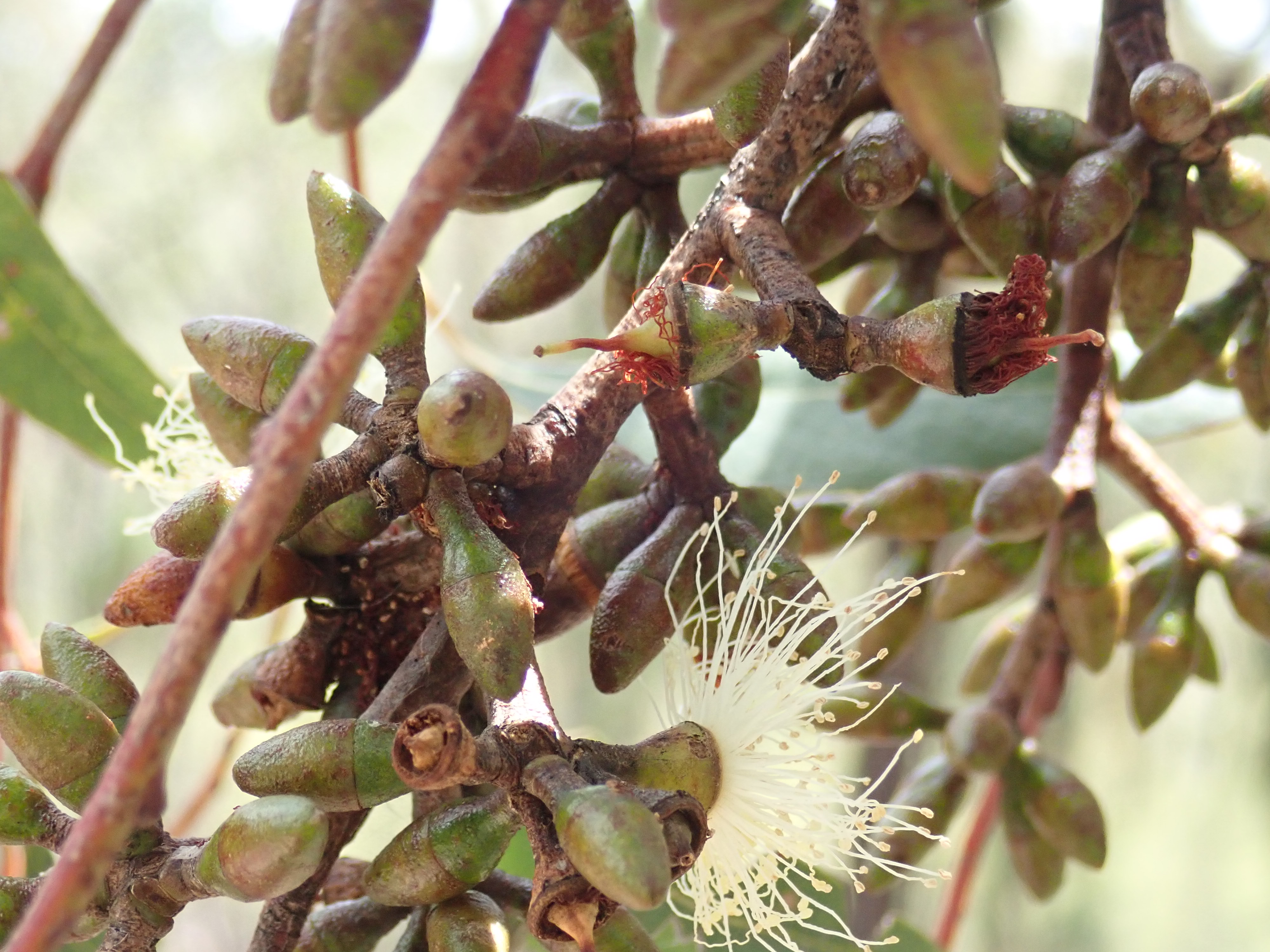
Flower buds and flowers

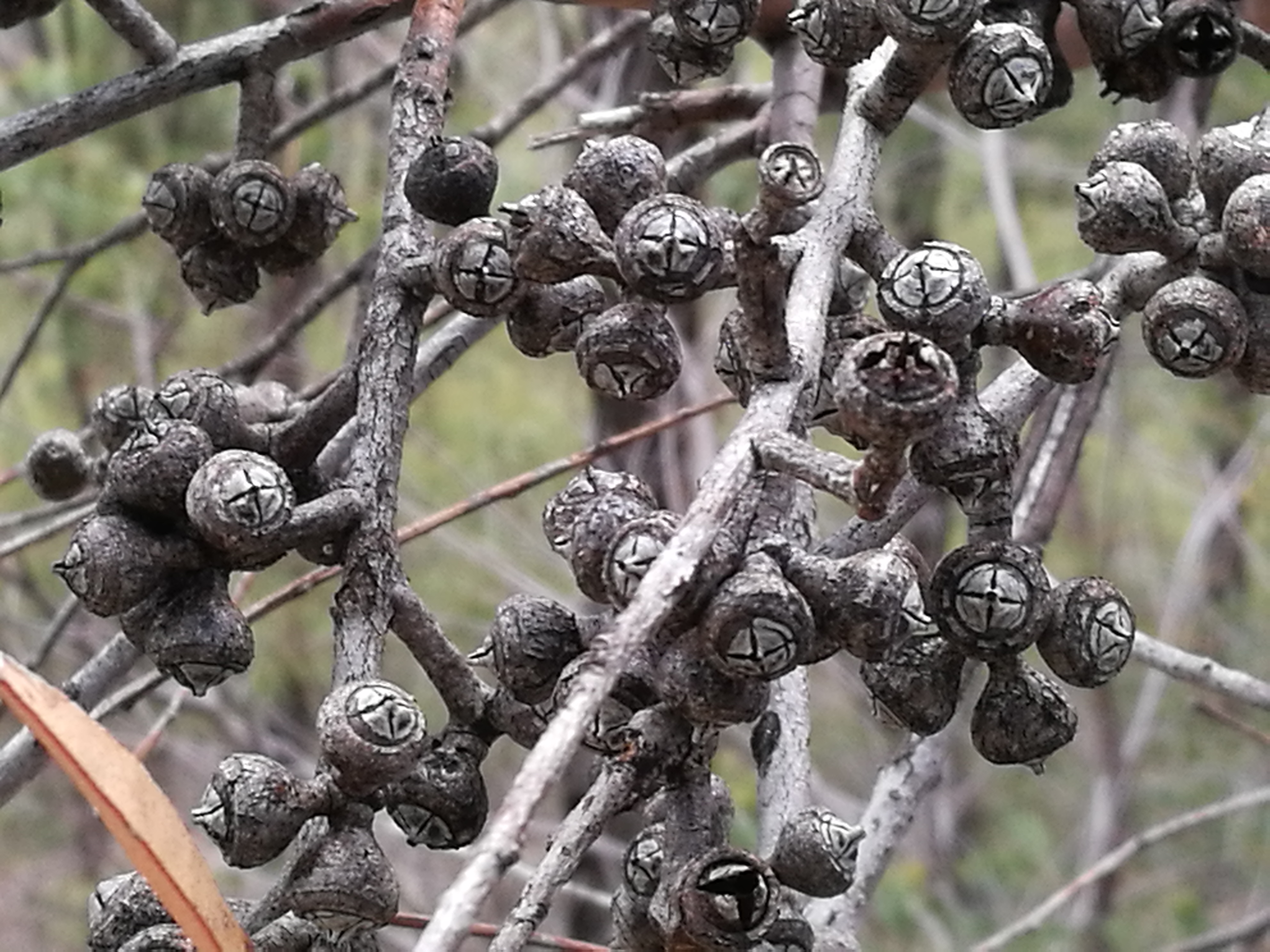
Fruit

Eucalyptus pumila, commonly known as the Pokolbin mallee, is a species of mallee that is endemic[ to New South Wales. It has smooth bark, lance-shaped to curved or elliptical adult leaves, flower buds in groups of seven, white flowers and hemispherical or cup-shaped fruit.

== Description ==
Eucalyptus pumila is a mallee that typically grows to a height of 5–6 m (16–20 ft) and forms a lignotuber. It has smooth copper-coloured bark that fades to grey and is shed in strips. Young plants and coppice regrowth have egg-shaped leaves that are egg-shaped, up to 100 mm (3.9 in) long and 60 mm (2.4 in) wide and petiolate. Adult leaves are the same shade of green on both sides, lance-shaped to curved or elliptical, 50–160 mm (2.0–6.3 in) long and 10–30 mm (0.39–1.18 in) wide tapering to a petiole 8–20 mm (0.31–0.79 in) long. The flower buds are usually arranged in leaf axils on a thick, unbranched peduncle 6–15 mm (0.24–0.59 in) long, the individual buds on pedicels 2–5 mm (0.079–0.197 in) long. Mature buds are oblong to oval, 7–11 mm (0.28–0.43 in) long and 4–6 mm (0.16–0.24 in) wide with a conical operculum. Flowering occurs between February and August and the flowers are white. The fruit is a woody, hemispherical or cup-shaped capsule 4–6 mm (0.16–0.24 in) long and 7–9 mm (0.28–0.35 in) wide with the valves strongly protruding.

== Taxonomy and naming ==
Eucalyptus pumila was first formally described in 1919 by Richard Cambage in Journal and Proceedings of the Royal Society of New South Wales. The specific epithet (pumila) is from the Latin pumilis meaning "dwarf" referring to the habit of this mallee.

== Distribution and habitat ==
Pokolbin mallee is restricted to the northern end of the Broken Back Range near Pokolbin where it grows in pure stands among sandstone rock outcrops on a steep hill. There are also historical records from Wyong and Sandy Hollow.

== Conservation status ==
This mallee is listed as "vulnerable" under the Australian Government Environment Protection and Biodiversity Conservation Act 1999 and the New South Wales Government Biodiversity Conservation Act 2016 . The main threats to the species are its small population size and inappropriate fire regimes. The IUCN Red List assesses the species as Vulnerable.

== Gallery ==
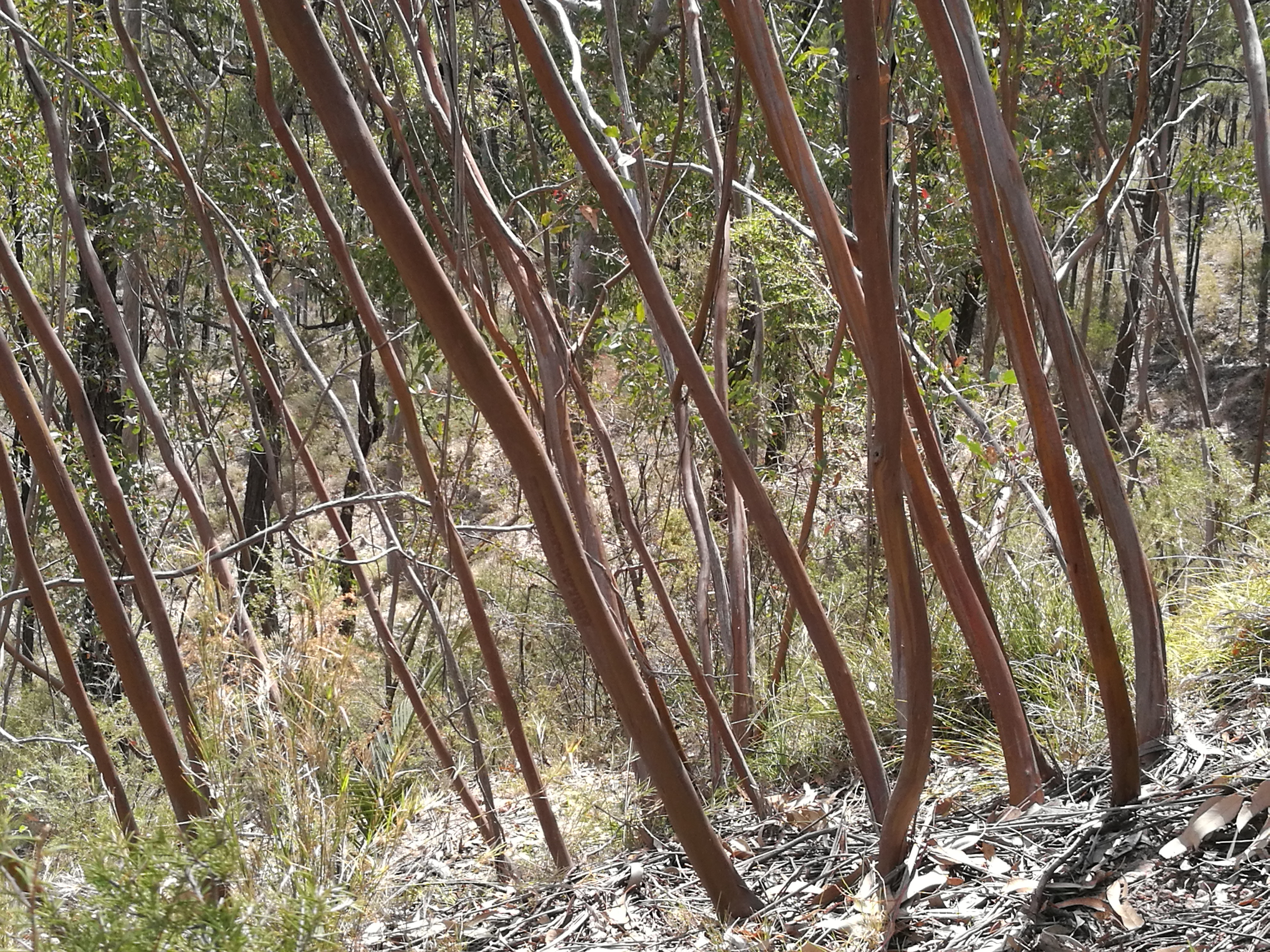

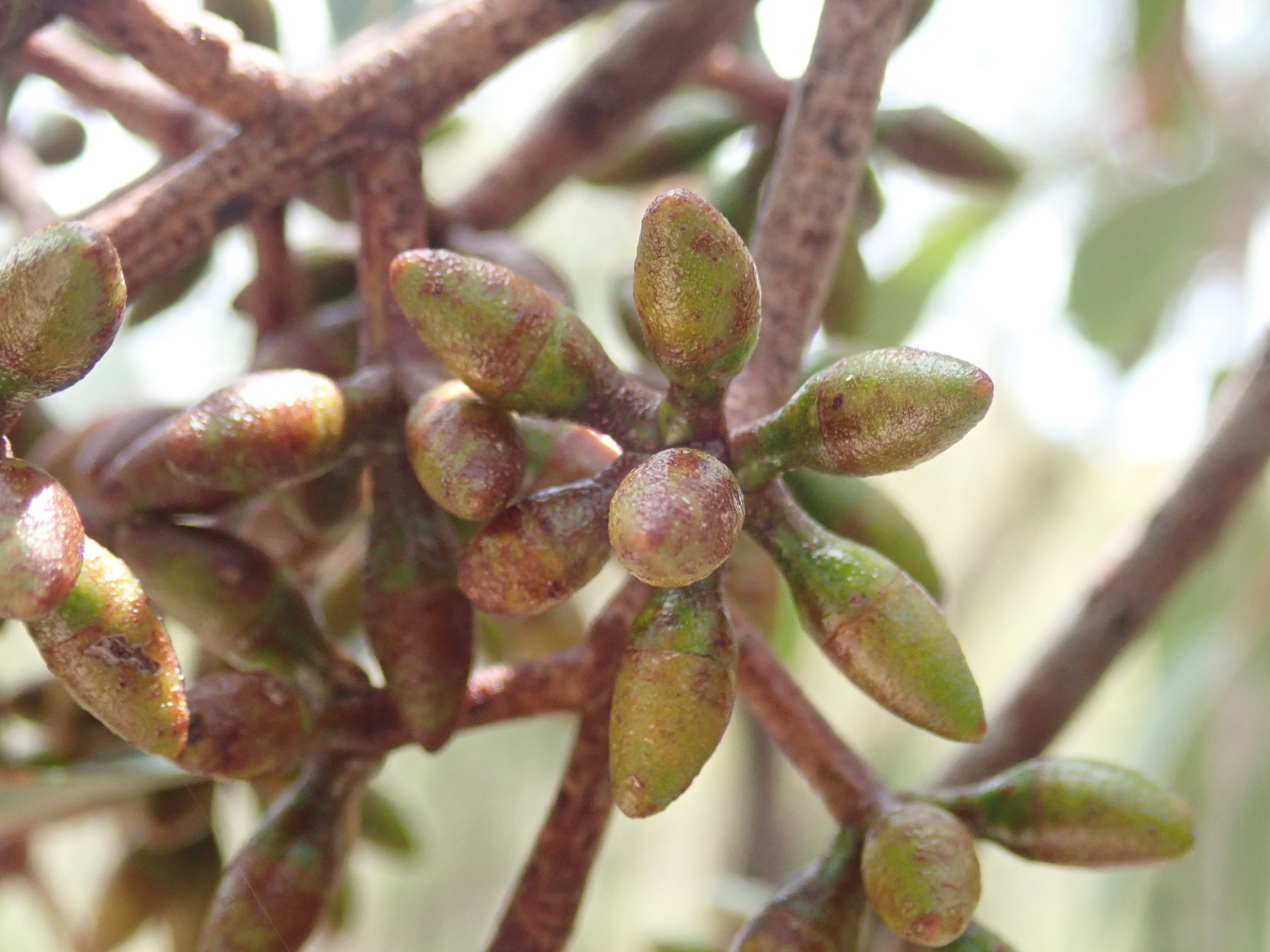

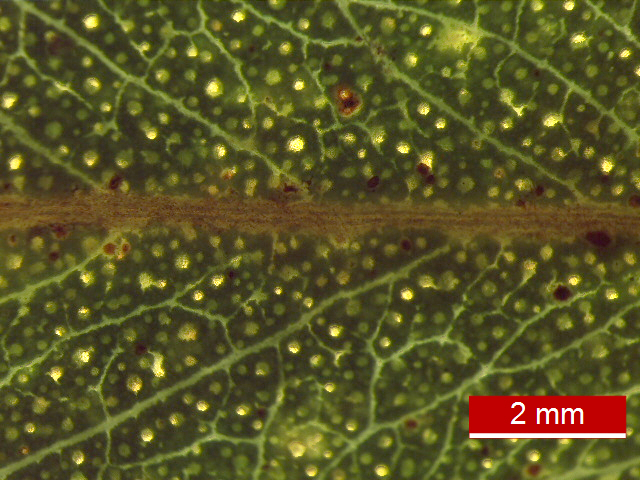

== See also ==
- List of Eucalyptus species
