= Cambage =

Cambage is a surname. Notable people with the surname include:

- Liz Cambage (born 1991), Australian basketball player
- Richard Hind Cambage (1859–1928), Australian botanist
