= Grey box =

Grey or gray box may refer to:

== Science and technology ==
- Gray box testing, software testing
- Grey box model, in mathematics, statistics, and computational modelling
- Grey identification method, used in system identification

=== Botany ===
- Jojoba (Simmondsia chinensis), also known as gray box bush

==== Eucalyptus ====
- Grey box, many trees in the genus Eucalyptus, native to Australia, including:
  - Eucalyptus argillacea (Kimberley grey box or northern grey box)
  - Eucalyptus bosistoana (coast grey box or Gippsland grey box)
  - Eucalyptus brownii (grey box)
  - Eucalyptus hemiphloia (grey box); See Eucalyptus albens
  - Eucalyptus largeana (grey box)
  - Eucalyptus microcarpa (grey box, inland grey box or western grey box)
  - Eucalyptus moluccana (grey box or coastal grey box)
  - Eucalyptus normantonensis (grey box)
  - Eucalyptus pilligaensis (narrow-leaved grey box, pilliga grey box)
  - Eucalyptus quadrangulata (grey box)
  - Eucalyptus rummeryi (grey box)
  - Eucalyptus tectifica (grey box)
