= Monofloral honey =

Honey from the nectar of one plant species

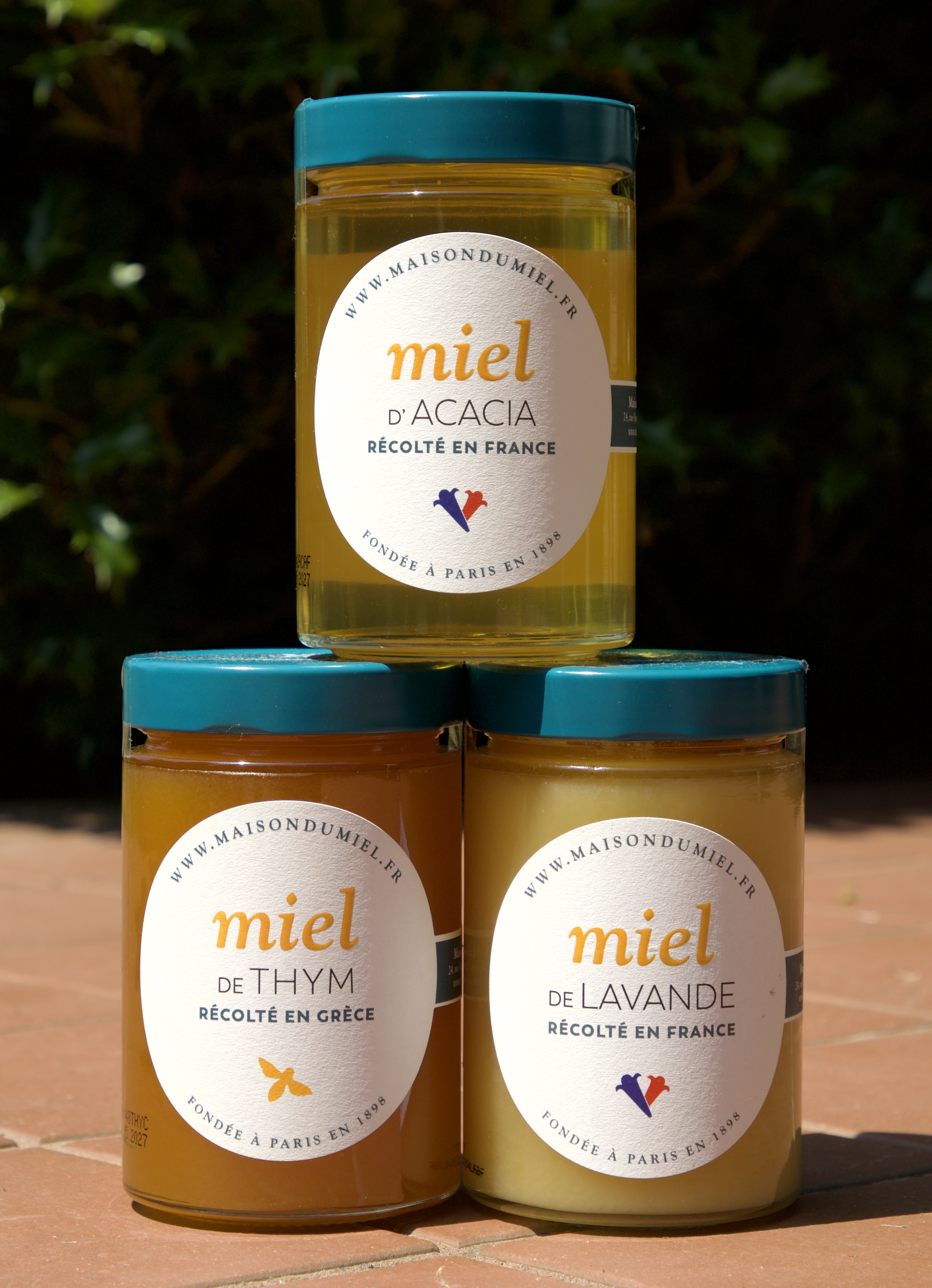
Three monofloral honey jars: acacia, lavender, and thyme

Monofloral honey is a type of honey which has a distinctive flavor or other attribute due to its being predominantly from the nectar of a single plant species. It is stored and labeled separately so as to command a premium price. While there may never be an absolute monofloral type, some honeys are relatively pure due to the prodigious nectar production of a particular species, such as citrus (orange blossom honey), or there may be little else in bloom at the time.

Beekeepers learn the predominant nectar sources of their region, and often plan harvests to keep especially fine ones separate. For example, in the southern Appalachians, sourwood honey, from a small tree that blooms late in the season, is highly regarded. Beekeepers try to remove the previously produced dark and strong flavored tulip poplar honey, just before the sourwood bloom, so it does not mix with the lighter sourwood. During sourwood bloom, there is little else for the bees to forage.

== Some types ==
Common name	Origin (Note: The range of the origin plant is wider than stated, usually worldwide. There may also be local concentrations in any part of the world, meaning the monofloral honey can be produced outside the stated countries of origin)	Characteristics and availability	Color
(False) Acacia	Eastern North America (native), Bulgaria, Hungary, Ukraine and Romania (main producers), Canada, China, France, Serbia and Italy	Acacia, a light and clear honey made from the blossoms of Robinia pseudoacacia (aka black locust/American acacia) has a mild delicate floral taste and is one of the most popular and sweetest honey varieties. It lasts as a liquid due to being high in fructose. It has a fairly low acid content, and is excellent for sweetening without altering the taste or the aroma of beverages.	Ranges from light yellow to almost colorless.
Alfalfa (Medicago sativa)	North America	Alfalfa honey, produced extensively from the purple or blue blossoms (the most important honey plant in most of the western states) throughout the summer, is white or extra light amber in color with a fine flavor – a subtle spicy profile and mildly scented floral aroma. Not as sweet as most honey types, its delicate nature does not overpower other flavors.	White
Apple blossom	United Kingdom		
Aster	United States	A distinctively sweet smelling, full bodied floral varietal, Aster honey is abundant in the Mid-South United States. It is light in color and prone to crystallize quickly. Relatively thick and smooth in consistency.	Light yellow
Avocado	Western United States	Collected from the California avocado blossoms, avocado honey is dark in color and is dissimilar in taste to the avocado fruit, yet shares with it a fairly rich and buttery flavour. This honey originated in Southern Mexico and is now a common crop in Central America, Australia and other tropical regions.	Dark amber
Basswood/Lime (linden) blossom (Tilia)	Ukraine, Russia, China, Hungary, Poland and the United Kingdom	Produced from the cream-colored basswood blossoms found throughout North America, basswood honey is one of the few exceptional honey varieties that has a water-white to light color and yet strong distinctive biting, mildly spicy flavour and a distinctive lingering aftertaste. It's somewhat fresh, pleasant "woody" scent is very good with teas like Earl Grey and works well in many recipes, e.g. for salad dressings and marinades.	Water-white or pale, depending on the time of collection
Blueberry	Northeastern US	Produced in New England and in Michigan, blueberry honey is taken from the tiny white flowers of the blueberry bush. It has a pleasant full, well-rounded flavor, a slight tang, and a blueberry aftertaste.	Light amber or amber
Blue gum	Australia and Tasmania	Blue gum, a Eucalyptus honey species, grows in South Australia and Tasmania. Its honey is amber in colour and dense in texture. Delicious on toast and wafers, this variety is popularly used as a breakfast or ice-cream drizzle.	Amber
Buckwheat (Fagopyrum esculentum)	United States, France, Canada, Japan, Poland, and the Netherlands	Aroma of hay, with intense, slightly bitter taste. United States, Canada, Europe.	Mahogany
Carrot	United States	Carrot honey has a dark amber color with an aroma reminiscent of chocolate. The taste is strong with a bite to it – a sharp spike in an otherwise earthy, caramel flavor. There is also a "grassy" aftertaste, something close to meadow honey. This honey's taste is different from other honeys. It shines through when used in recipes. Carrot honey is obtained when carrot plants run to seed. This happens usually on specialist seed-breeding farms, or when bees collect nectar from wild carrots.	Dark amber
Cherry blossom	United Kingdom, Italy		
Chestnut	France, Italy, Greece	A dark honey with one of the highest mineral contents of all honeys.	Yellowish-brown
Chinese tallow tree	Southeastern United States	Tallow trees produce a very heavy honey flow of high-quality honey in May and June in the Southeastern states into Texas and beekeepers often move their hives into tallow tree areas to harvest the bountiful nectar. Honey is dark with a tangy taste that is prized.	Dark amber
Clover	Canada, United States, Sweden and New Zealand.	Clover honey is a variety of honey made by bees that are fed clover. Depending on the location and source, clover honey varies in color from water white to different tones of amber. White clover in particular is grown as a widespread blooming pasture crop and is a major nectar source in many parts of the world. The nectar from clover contains a higher water content and a larger proportion of glucose relative to fructose than found in many other varieties. As a result, clover honey tends to have a higher water content, which may permit it to crystallize more readily over time. Crystallization of honey does not indicate spoilage, but tends to be aesthetically undesirable, so producers may alter their procedures to avoid the hygroscopic honey from absorbing more moisture from the atmosphere.	White to tones of amber
Dandelion	New Zealand, China	Harvested from New Zealand's South Island, dandelion honey is a relatively strong honey blended with mild tangy notes. This dark amber honey delivers a distinct floral aroma of dandelions which are traditionally prized as a medicinal herb in China (including Tibet) and India for its broad spectrum of powerful healing properties.	Dark amber
Eucalyptus	Common in Australia, in Western Cape in South Africa, and in Brazil.	Monofloral eucalypt honeys include jarrah, yellow box, grey box, blue gum, river red gum, ironbark, stringybark and messmate. Eucalyptus honey varies greatly in color and flavor, but in general, it tends to be a bold-flavored honey with a slightly medicinal aftertaste. It may be used in baked goods, sauces, dressings. (Tasmanian leatherwood honey is considered a delicacy, but is not a eucalypt honey)	Light amber to medium-dark red
Fireweed	Northwestern US, Western Canada	Fireweed honey is produced in great quantities in some areas of western Canada and northwestern US and is considered a premium monofloral.	Amber
Gallberry	Southeastern United States	Has a rich but not overpowering flavor and is produced almost exclusively in the coastal Southeast.	Very dark amber
Goldenrod (genus Solidago)		With acid soil, adequate moisture and good foraging weather during the autumn bloom, bees can make large quantities of honey from it. Much of it is sold for bakery use, but in some areas it has become a favored monofloral honey. Has a curious, distinctive and powerful smell, that has been described by some 'like caramel and milk is mixed into the honey', a spicy smell. Others suggest a faint licorice aroma. There is a peculiar discrepancy between the smell and its taste, and between varieties. The taste has been variously described as: 'a bit of a bite', 'a butterscotch-like flavor', 'similar to dandelion honey'.	Amber
Hawthorn	United Kingdom, Italy		
Common heather, Ling	Mainly from moorland in the United Kingdom		
Jarrah	Jarrah (Eucalyptus marginata) is a native tree unique to Western Australia (WA).		
Jujube, or Yemen sidr	Yemen, Pakistan	Traditional honey with reputed health benefits. Found in the desert areas of Yemen, Pakistan's potohar region sidr trees are also known as jujube, or Ziziphus zizyphus	Yellowish-brown
Kamahi	New Zealand	The creamy colored flowers of this common tree are very attractive to bees.	Light amber
Kiawe Prosopsis pallida, see mesquite			
Kudzu (Pueraria montana var. lobata)	Japan, elsewhere where the plant is naturalised	Bee colonies may forage on kudzu flowers when there is a drought of nectar from other flower sources. The resultant honey has a rich red or purple hue, a low viscosity, and is described as having a flavour similar to bubblegum or grape jelly.	Varies from red to purple
Lavender	Produced mainly in France, Italy and Spain	Woody, floral	Light yellow
Leatherwood (Eucryphia lucida)	Tasmania	A richly aromatic and distinctly floral honey, with spicy, caramel and vanilla undertones, and a lingering floral aftertaste.	Dark amber
Lehua	Hawaii	Lehua honey is made from the lehua (blossoms) of the ʻōhiʻa lehua (Metrosideros polymorpha), and is probably the rarest Hawaiian honey. It is liquid when harvested from the hives but turns into a creamy, sturdy honey after a couple of weeks.	
Leptospermum	Australia, New Zealand	Made from any of dozens of shrub-like evergreen tree species	
Macadamia			Dark amber
Manuka	New Zealand and Australia	Manuka honey is from bees who feed on the flowers of the Manuka bush, also known as the "tea tree" to produce a honey that has anti-bacterial properties. Tea tree oil is commonly from the related Melaleuca tree native to Australia.	Dark cream to dark brown. It is also notably viscous.
Mesquite	Southwestern U.S.	The mesquite tree is prized for its sweet-smoky smelling wood, primarily used in barbecues and meat smokers. The honey produced from its flowers also has this distinctive smoky aroma.	Dark brown and viscous. Remains semi-crystalline even in hot weather.
Nodding thistle, or musk thistle (Carduus nutans)	Worldwide	Considered a noxious weed in many areas of the world, but produces a good honey.	Light amber
Orange blossom	France, Italy (Sicily), Mexico, Brazil and Spain; southern Greece; United States (Arizona, California, Texas, and Florida)	Is actually made from mixed citrus nectars. It is a thick, very sweet honey. Strong aroma.	Light amber to white, the lighter color and milder flavor coming in years when there is a large harvest and the honey is little contaminated by other nectars.
Tulip tree, or poplar (Liriodendron tulipifera)	Southern Appalachia, US	Tulip tree is actually not a poplar, but the honey called "poplar" is a favorite regional monofloral honey.	Dark amber or black, when held to the light may appear reddish.
Rape	Central and Eastern Europe	A floral – fresh fruit (fruity) aroma, warm, medium intensity. Low acidity and medium sweetness, short persistence, aftertaste sometimes present (blackcurrant). When crystallised in very small crystals, refreshing (like "fondant")	Light yellow, whitish or dull ivory when crystallized.
Raspberry	United States	Available in some areas where raspberries are grown commercially.	
Rata (Metrosideros umbellata)	New Zealand	One of several species of Metrosideros but is the one that most regularly produces a honey crop, though sometimes it is in short supply.	Very white when pure
Rewarewa	New Zealand	The honey flavor is malty. Rewarewa, Knightia excelsa, was called New Zealand honeysuckle tree.	Reddish amber
Rosemary	France, Italy, Portugal and Spain		
Saguaro	Southwest US and Northwest Mexico	Tends to crystallize and be somewhat chunky. Not good for use in tea.	Ranges from light yellow to dark yellow/brown.
Sage (Salvia)		Sage honey almost never crystallizes.	
Sourwood	Southeastern United States, especially Appalachia	Thin and complex, tasting almost like clover honey initially, with a characteristic faint sour aftertaste.	Straw colored.
Star thistle (Centaurea solstitialis)	US, especially California	Thick and simple tasting honey. It has no aftertaste and is considered a milder version of clover honey in taste.	Light golden yellow
Strawberry tree (Arbutus undeo)	Italy, Portugal, Northern Greece	Has a characteristic bitter taste. It is a typical Mediterranean monofloral honey. Its production ranges are mostly in Sardinia and Portugal. It is eaten as complimentary to salted foods, such as cheese and bacon.	Light yellow
Sunflower	France, Italy and Spain	Because sunflower honey crystallizes quickly, becoming soft and easy to spread, it is often consumed in its crystallized state.	Pale yellow
Tawari	New Zealand	"The nectar is copious and very watery producing a prolific honey crop... often with a high final moisture content... [and high] fructose." Ixerba brexioides.	Light
Wild thyme	New Zealand, Greece, Italy	Thyme honey is the most popular honey produced in Greece. Thyme continues to flourish today in New Zealand's Central Otago.	Dark amber
Tupelo	Southeastern United States	Made from trees of the genus Nyssa which are native to wetlands of southeastern US. In many areas the forests have been cut over, greatly reducing the supply of the honey. It is favored for some uses because it is very slow to granulate. Northern Florida is a major producer. Honey that is certified by laboratory analysis as purely tupelo brings a premium price.	
Ulmo (Eucryphia cordifolia)	Chile	Taste and aroma of aniseed, jasmine, vanilla and cloves, with a touch of tea and caramel. Compared to manuka honey as a medicinal.	Amber
Viper's bugloss	New Zealand	This wild flower covers the hills of central South Island during summer months. The seed was once used as a treatment for snakebite, which gives the plant its name.	

== See also ==
- List of honey plants
- List of Northern American nectar sources for honey bees
- Mad honey – Psychoactive type of honey containing grayanotoxins
- Nectar source – Flowering plant that produces nectar
