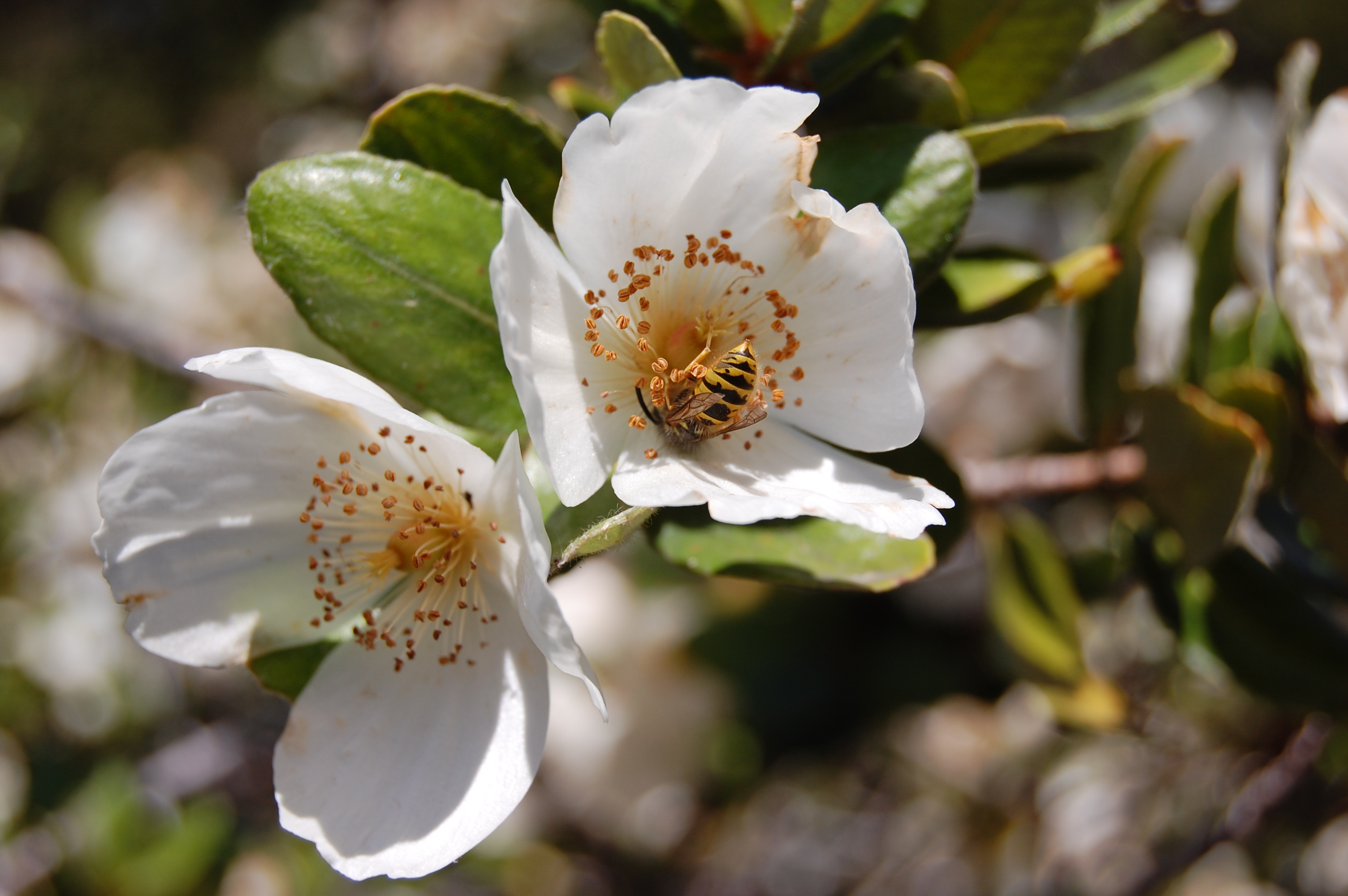
- Eucryphia cordifolia, South America
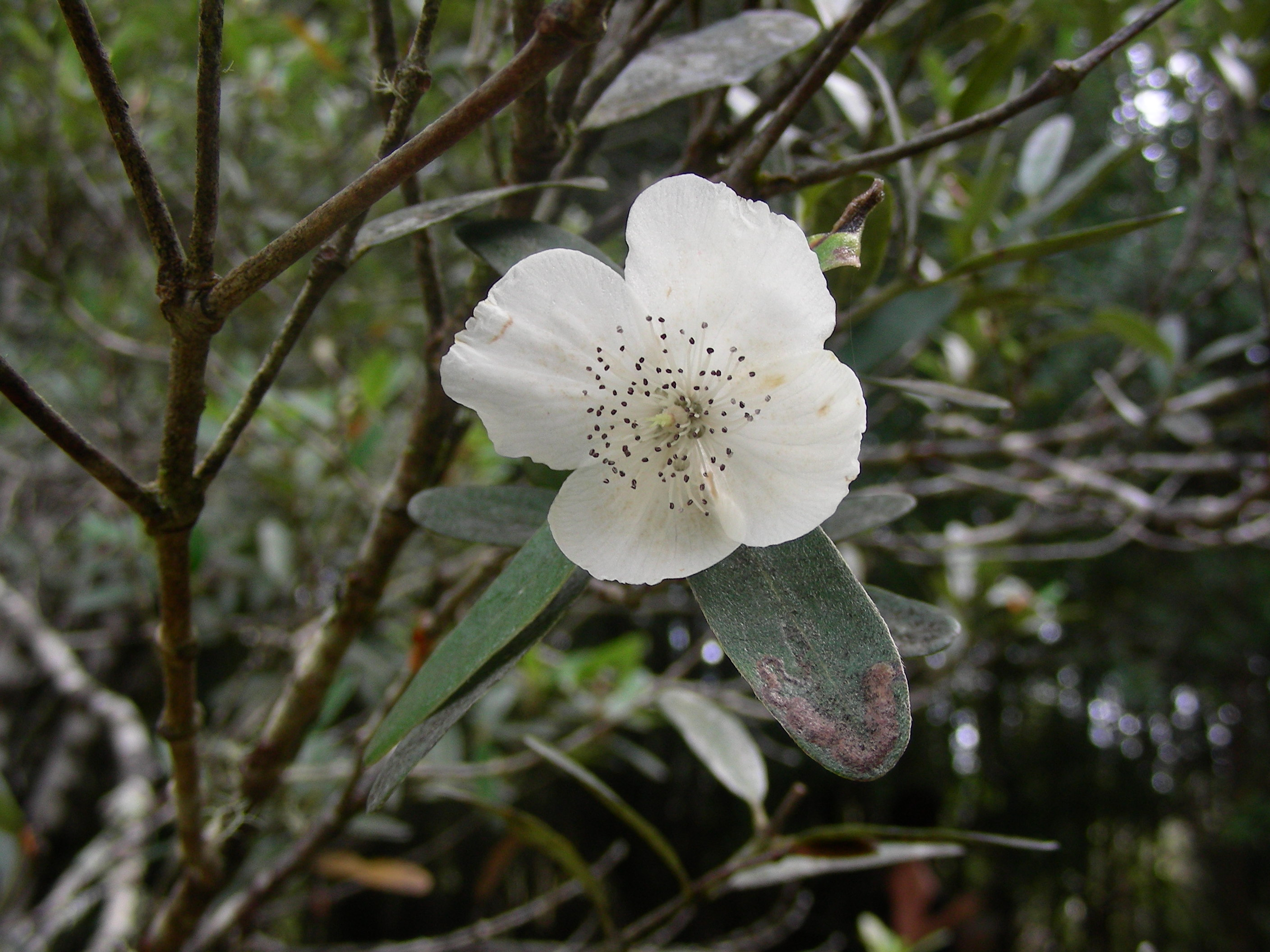
- Eucryphia lucida, Tasmania, Australia

Scientific classification
- Kingdom: Plantae
- Clade: Embryophytes
- Clade: Tracheophytes
- Clade: Angiosperms
- Clade: Eudicots
- Clade: Rosids
- Order: Oxalidales
- Family: Cunoniaceae
- Genus: Eucryphia; Cav.

Type species
- Eucryphia cordifolia Cav. (1798)

Species
- See text

Synonyms
- Pellinia Molina; Carpodontos Labill.

= Eucryphia =

Genus of flowering trees and shrubs

Eucryphia is a small genus of trees and large shrubs native to the south temperate regions of South America and coastal eastern Australia, predominantly Tasmania. Some common names include leatherwood in Australia, and Ulmo, Nirre or Guindo santo in Argentina and Chile. Sometimes placed in a family of their own, the Eucryphiaceae, they are placed by more recent classifications in the Cunoniaceae. There are seven species, two in South America and five in Australia, and several named hybrids.

== Description ==
They are mostly evergreen though one species (E. glutinosa) is usually deciduous.

The leaves are opposite, and either simple or pinnate with 3–13 leaflets. The flowers are produced in late summer or autumn, are showy and sweetly scented, 3–6 cm (1.2–2.4 in) diameter, with four creamy-white petals, and numerous stamens and styles. The fruit is a woody capsule 1–1.5 cm (0.4–0.6 in) long containing several seeds, and maturing in 12–15 months.

== Etymology ==
The generic name Eucryphia is composed of two parts, namely eu- and -cryphia. The Greek ευ-κρυφαιος means well-covered and refers to the foliage, which is clustered towards the apex of branches.

== Species ==
=== Extant species ===
- Eucryphia cordifolia Cav. – Valdivian temperate rain forests of southern Chile and Argentina. A tree growing up to 40 m (130 ft) tall; leaves simple, crenate to serrated, evergreen, 3–7 cm (1.2–2.8 in) long. Its wood is used for construction, furniture and lumber, and its nectar for honey.
- Eucryphia glutinosa (Poepp. & Endl.) Baill. – Valdivian temperate rain forests of southern Chile. A large shrub to 7 m (23 ft) tall; leaves pinnate, with 3–5 leaflets, serrated, deciduous or semi-evergreen, 3–6 cm (1.2–2.4 in) long.
- Eucryphia jinksii P.I.Forst. – subtropical New South Wales and Queensland mountain rainforests endemic, Australia. A tree to 25 m (82 ft) tall; leaves simple or with 3 leaflets, entire, evergreen, 5–10 cm long (discovered 1994).
- Eucryphia lucida (Labill.) Baill. – Tasmania Australia. A tree to 20–30 m (66–98 ft) tall; leaves simple, entire, evergreen, 3–7 cm (1.2–2.8 in) long. Common name is Tasmanian leatherwood and it is a major commercial source of monofloral honey.
- Eucryphia milliganii Hook.f. (syn. E. lucida var. milliganii). – Tasmania Australia. A tree to 6 m (20 ft) tall or more often a shrub; leaves simple, entire, evergreen, 1.5–3 cm (0.6–1.2 in) long.
- Eucryphia moorei F.Muell. – New South Wales, Victoria temperate rainforests, Australia. Also known as pinkwood, eastern leatherwood or plumwood, is a tree to 30 m tall; leaves pinnate, with 7–15 leaflets, entire, evergreen, 6–12 cm (2.4–4.7 in) long.
- Eucryphia wilkiei B.Hyland – Queensland wet tropics mountain top cloud forests endemic, Australia, is a large shrub. Discovered in January 1970 by Jack (John H.) Wilkie.

=== Extinct species ===
- Eucryphia falcata (Late Palaeocene, Lake Bungarby)
- Eucryphia microstoma (Early Eocene, Regatta Point)
- Eucryphia aberensis (Middle to Late Eocene, Loch Aber).

=== Natural hybrids ===
There are two known natural hybrids, although additional, artificial hybrids have been created. However, these are not naturally occurring.

- Eucryphia × hybrida J.Bausch - natural hybrid of E. lucida and E. milliganii native to Tasmania
- Eucryphia × nymansensis J.Bausch - natural hybrid of E. cordifolia and E. glutinosa native to Chile

== Artificial hybrids and cultivars ==
(those marked agm have gained the Royal Horticultural Society's Award of Garden Merit)

- E. × intermedia (E. glutinosa × E. lucida)
  - E. × intermedia 'Rostrevor'agm
- E. × hillieri (E. moorei × E. lucida): Developed from a self-sown seedling at the nursery of Hillier & Sons, Chandlers Ford in Hampshire around 1953.
- E. × nymansensis (E. cordifolia × E. glutinosa)
  - E. × nymansensis 'Nymansay'agm originated from Lt. Col. Leonard C.R. Messel's garden at Nymans, Sussex (1913)
  - E. × nymansensis 'Nymans Silver' is a sport discovered at Nymans, Sussex in 2005. It is a variegated form with serrated oval leaves that are outlined in creamy white. It was discovered growing on a E. × nymansensis within the garden. It is considered to be faster growing and more columnar in nature. The name 'Nymans Silver' was proposed by Philip Holmes, Deputy Head Gardener at Nymans.'
- E. 'Penwith' (E. cordifolia × E. lucida)
- E. × hybrida (E. glutinosa × E. lucida)

== Uses ==
The species and their hybrids are attractive small trees for gardens, typically with a slender conic crown when young, though widening with age. They are valued for their conspicuous scented flowers, produced in late summer and autumn when few or no other trees are in flower. Cultivation is restricted to areas with mild winters, cool summers and good rainfall; away from their native areas, this restricts them to the Atlantic coastal regions of Europe, the Pacific Northwest of North America, and New Zealand.

=== Honey ===
The nectar of two of the species provides an important sources of honey. Eucryphia lucida from Tasmania is the main source of a very distinctively flavoured honey known as leatherwood (the common name for the species). Some of this honey may come from the other Tasmanian species, E. milliganii. In Chile, ulmo honey (again after the local species name) comes from E. cordifolia. Leatherwood honey and ulmo honey are very similar in flavour, even though the two species have probably been separated for more than 45 million years.
