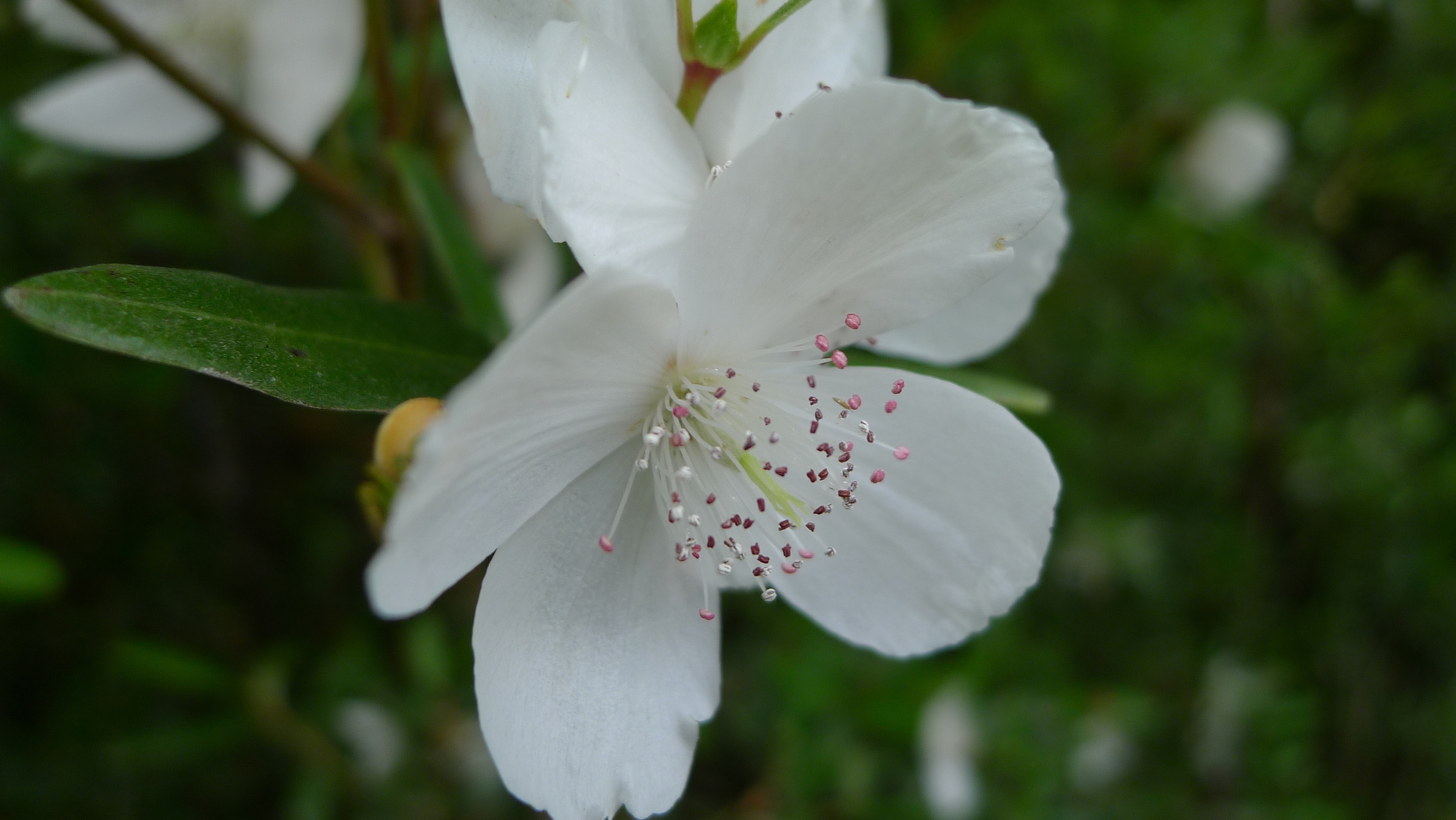
- Flower, Montezuma Falls, Tasmania, Australia, 5 Jan 2012 by John Tann
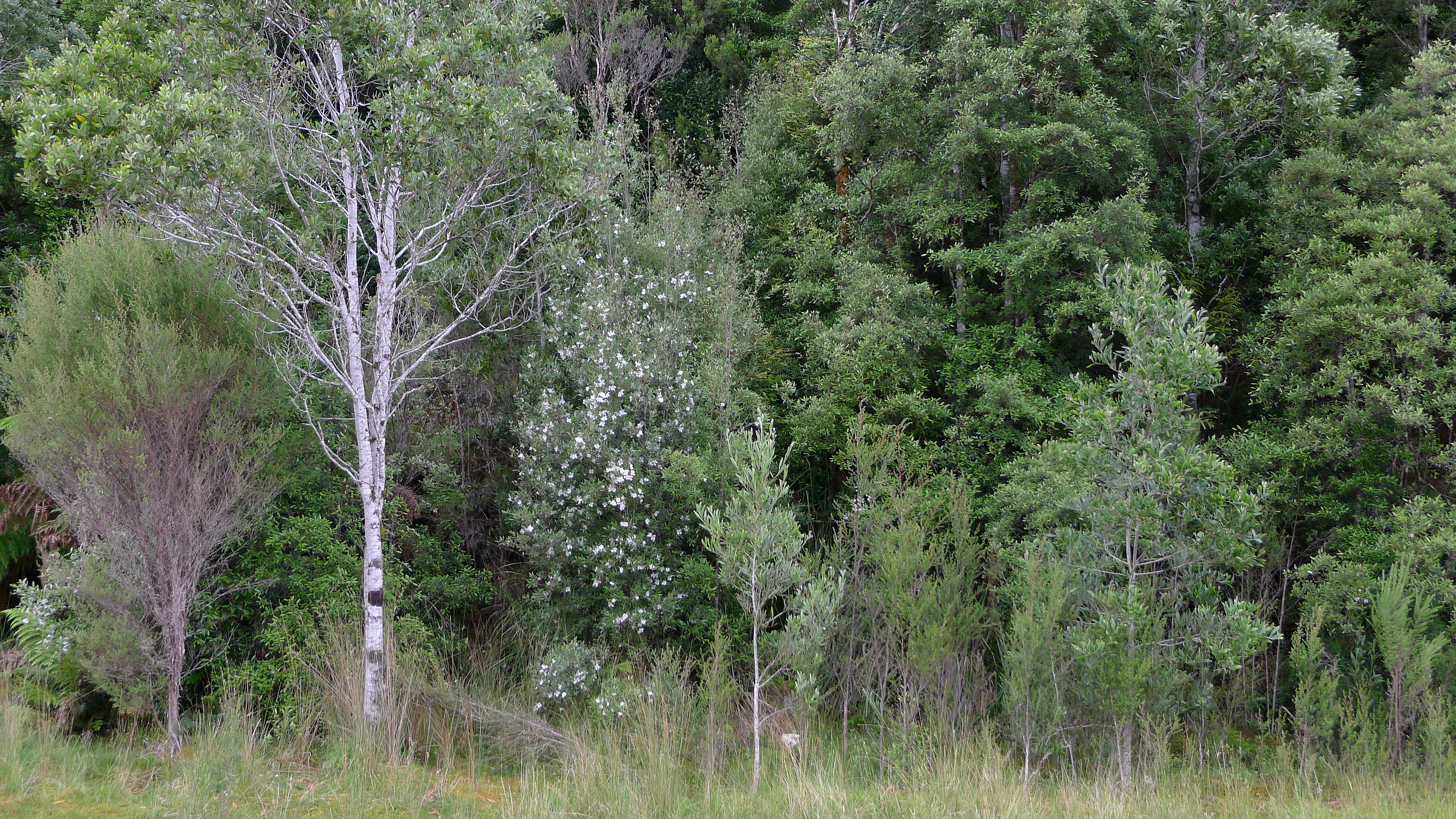
- Young, growing sapling in full flower and growth (source of above flower)

Conservation status
- Least Concern (IUCN 3.1)

Scientific classification
- Kingdom: Plantae
- Clade: Tracheophytes
- Clade: Angiosperms
- Clade: Eudicots
- Clade: Rosids
- Order: Oxalidales
- Family: Cunoniaceae
- Genus: Eucryphia
- Species: E. lucida

Binomial name
- Eucryphia lucida (Labill.) Baill.

Synonyms
- Carpodontos lucida Labill.; Eucryphia billardierei Spach

= Eucryphia lucida =

Leatherwood

Species of flowering plant

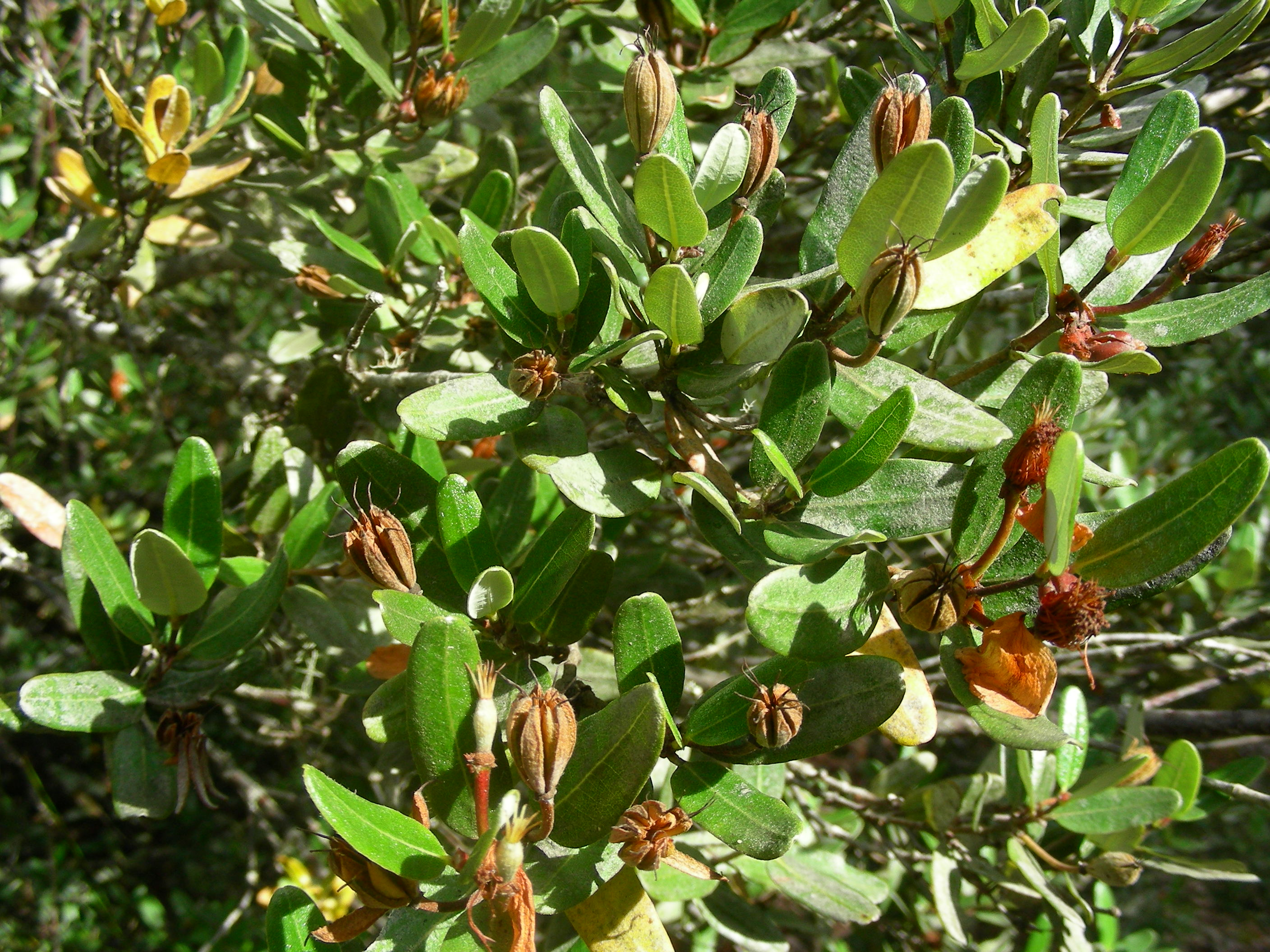
Opening ripe fruits. Overland Track, Cradle Mountain-Lake St Clair National Park, Tasmania, Australia, 17 April 2013 by Doug Beckers

Eucryphia lucida, the leatherwood, is a species of tree or large shrub endemic to forests of western Tasmania, Australia. An attractive plant used in both horticulture and apiculture, it was promoted by the Tasmanian Branch of the then SGAP as an alternative to the Tasmanian blue gum (Eucalyptus globulus) for Tasmania's floral emblem. It was described as E. billiarderi at one stage, this now being a synonym.

== Description ==
Ranging from 2–10 m (6.6–32.8 ft) in height, it can sometimes grow to 25 m (82 ft) in favourable conditions. The small dark green glossy leaves are elliptical in shape and 2–4 cm (1–1.5 in) long. Appearing in spring and summer, the 2.5–4 cm (1–1.5 in) diameter white flowers have four petals and resemble small single roses and have a strong fragrance, especially on warmer days. The flower parts are often covered with a sticky sap. Flowering is followed by leathery capsules which mature in autumn.

The species was first described by Jacques Labillardière.

== Distribution and habitat ==
It is widespread and common in moister forests in Tasmania, occurring mainly across the western parts of the state, from the northwest in such places as the Tarkine and through the South West Wilderness. It grows as an understorey plant and prefers wetter climates of 1500–2500 mm annual rainfall.

Fossil leaves from Early Pleistocene sediments at Regatta Point in Western Tasmania show similarities to Eucryphia lucida and suggest a close relationship.

== Cultivation ==
Leatherwood is easily propagated by seed or cutting and makes an attractive, fast-growing garden plant. It thrives in well-drained soil in a position with some shelter and extra moisture. It does require regular pruning to keep a neat shape. It is also used by Tasmanian beekeepers in the making of leatherwood honey, a noted monofloral honey that has been recognised by the international Slow Food movement in its Ark of Taste. For many years, the Tasmanian Beekeepers' Association has had to lobby the Tasmanian government to ensure continued access to this resource, and to protect it from logging.

Much of the leatherwood is difficult to access, growing deep within the forests of Tasmania's wild west coast. Beekeepers from Tasmania camp in the forest during the leatherwood harvest, which occurs between January and March.

=== Cultivars ===
- E. 'Ballerina' (ACRA reference: ACC469) is a larger flowered form with pink flowers rimmed with red, collected from a plant in western Tasmania in 1986. It is a paler pink than 'Pink Cloud'.
- E. 'Dumpling' is a compact white-flowered form to 1 metre high developed in the UK by Suttons of Devon.
- E. 'Gillanders' Rose' is a pink flowered form.
- E. 'Gilt Edge' has trifoliate leaves with a creamy yellow margin on the topside. It produces white flowers that open flat.
- E. 'Gold Rim'
- E. 'Leatherwood Cream' (ACRA reference: ACC006) is another selection, this time with variegated cream-edged leaves.
- E. 'Pink Cloud' (ACRA reference: ACC368) is a pink-flowered cultivar collected from plants growing near Smithton in North-West Tasmania in 1984 by Ken Gillanders.
- E. 'Spring Glow' is a variegated Eucryphia with eye-catching cream-edged evergreen leaves and attractive white flowers.
