= White box =

White box may refer to:

== Technology ==
- White box (software engineering), a subsystem whose internals can be viewed
  - White-box testing, in software testing
- White box (computer hardware), a personal computer assembled from off-the-shelf parts
- White-box cryptography, a cryptographic system designed to be secure even when its internals are viewed
- Whitebox Geospatial Analysis Tools, a GIS & remote sensing software package
- White box system, a bilge water monitoring and control system for ships

== Arts and entertainment ==
- WHITEbox, an album set by Sunn O)))
- "White Box", a special Christmas episode in Series 5 of Absolutely Fabulous
- "White box", a release of the original Dungeons & Dragons rules
- The White Box, a set of books about tabletop game design by Jeremy Holcomb and Jeff Tidball
- Shirobako (lit. White Box), an anime television series produced by P.A.Works
- WhiteBox (art center), an arts center in New York City, US

== Other uses ==
- Eucalyptus albens or white box, a tree species from Australia

== See also ==
- Black box (disambiguation)
- Grey box (disambiguation)
- White cube gallery
- White goods
