= Eucryphia falcata =

Scientific classification
- Kingdom: Plantae
- Clade: Tracheophytes
- Clade: Angiosperms
- Clade: Eudicots
- Clade: Rosids
- Order: Oxalidales
- Family: Cunoniaceae
- Genus: Eucryphia
- Species: †E. falcata

Binomial name
- †Eucryphia falcata Hill

Extinct species of flowering plant

Eucryphia falcata is an extinct species of flowering plant. It belongs to the genus Eucryphia within the family Cunoniaceae.

== Description ==
Macrofossils of compound leaves with an unknown number of total leaflets have been found. The lateral leaflets are falcate, and the terminal leaflet is symmetrical. It has a rounded base. The leaf margin had serrations. This is likely the plesiomorphic condition for all genera of the family Cunoniaceae. The leaves also had trichomes.

== Etymology ==
The specific epithet falcata is derived from the falcate, lateral leaflets of the compound leaves.

== Temporal range ==
This species lived during the late Paleocene, during the timeframe of 58.7 to 55.8 Ma. It is the oldest fossil Eucryphia species.

== Distribution ==
One fossil specimen has been found near Bunyan, New South Wales, Australia. The fossil was found in lake sediments of the Lake Bungarby, which is a terrestrial mudstone dating back to the Paleocene.
