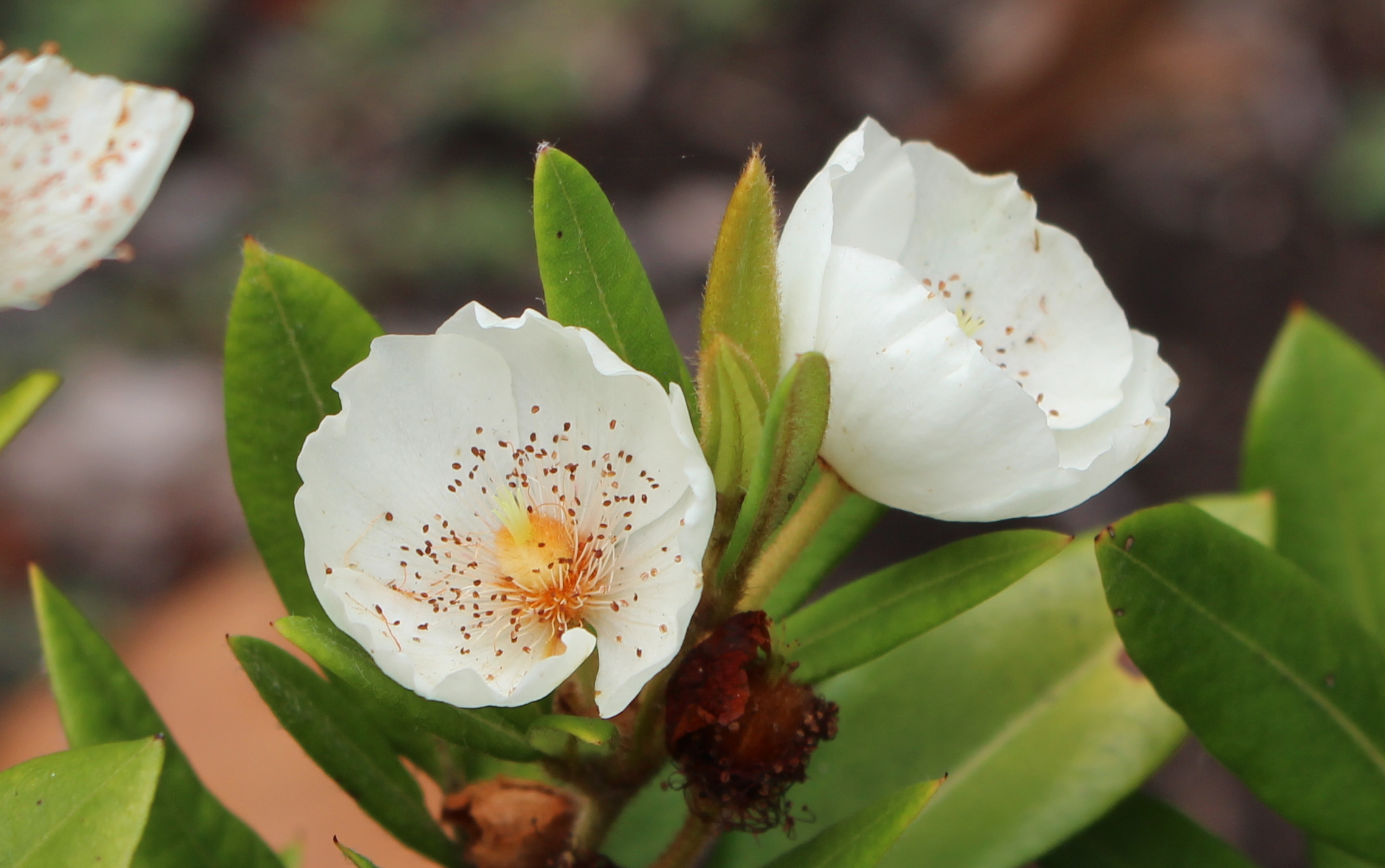

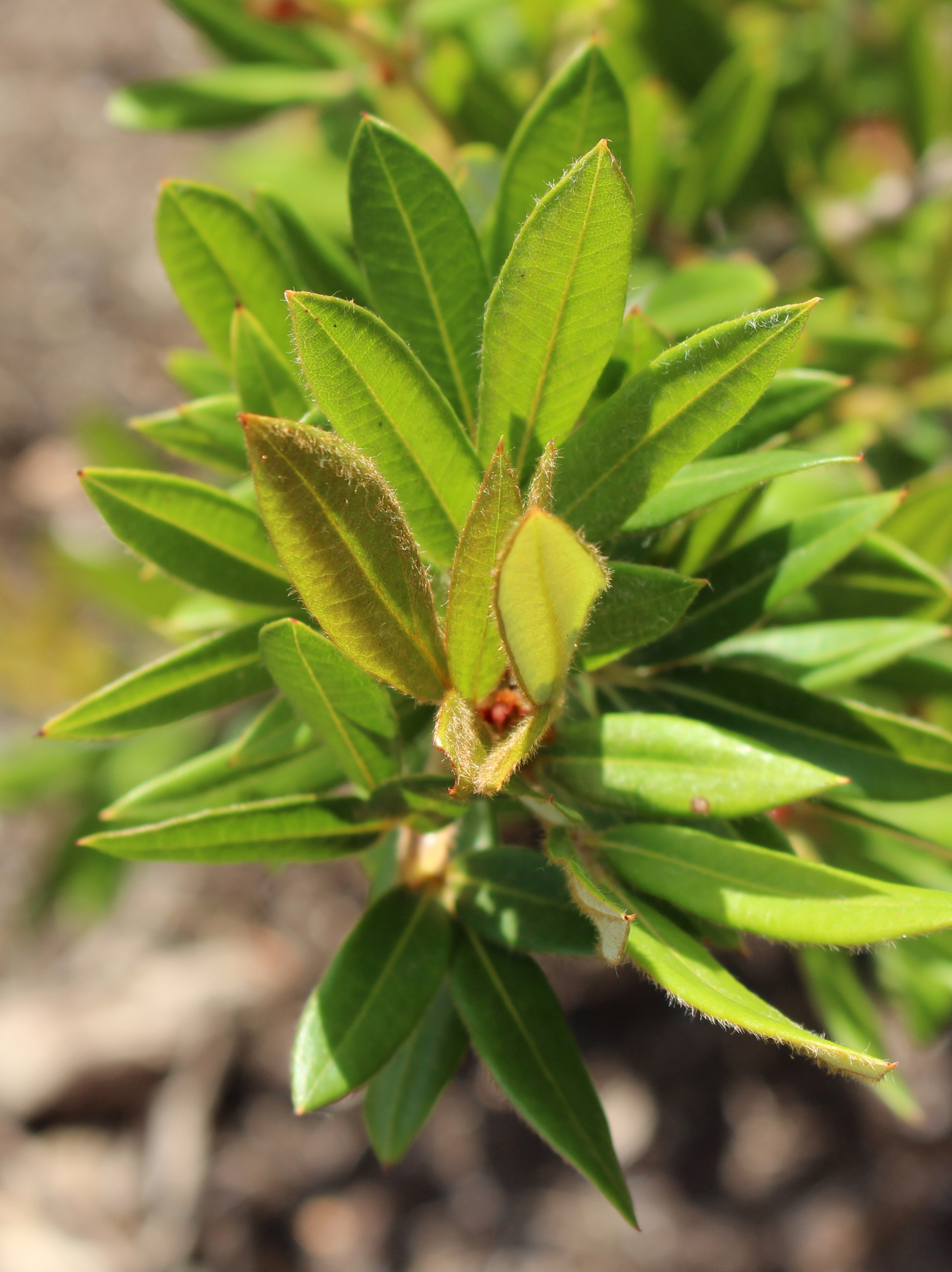

Conservation status
- Vulnerable (NCA)

Scientific classification
- Kingdom: Plantae
- Clade: Tracheophytes
- Clade: Angiosperms
- Clade: Eudicots
- Clade: Rosids
- Order: Oxalidales
- Family: Cunoniaceae
- Genus: Eucryphia
- Species: E. wilkiei

Binomial name
- Eucryphia wilkiei B.Hyland

= Eucryphia wilkiei =

Species of tree

Eucryphia wilkiei is a species of rainforest shrub endemic to restricted areas of cloud forests on mountain tops in the Wet Tropics region of northeastern Queensland, Australia. As of November 2013, botanists classify Eucryphia in the family Cunoniaceae.

Naturally, they grow 1 to 6 m (3 to 20 ft) tall and occur only within an altitude range of about 1,200 to 1,500 m (4,000 to 5,000 ft).

In Jan. 1970 Jack (John H.) Wilkie (1902–1997), orchid expert and botanical explorer of the Mount Bellenden Ker region, was the first European–Australian person to scientifically discover them. Bernie Hyland formally scientifically described the species name in 1997.

Eucryphia wilkiei’s, endemic, very restricted distribution has obtained the conservation status of "vulnerable", officially listed in the regulation current as of 27 September 2013, of the Queensland government legislation, the Nature Conservation Act 1992.
