= Ken Gillanders =

Australian botanist

Ken Gillanders OAM
- Born: 1930 (age 95–96); Melbourne
- Occupations: Botanist; horticulturist; nurseryman
- Known for: Woodbank Nursery
- Awards: Medal of the Order of Australia

Ken Gillanders is an Australian botanist, horticulturist, nurseryman and plantman from Tasmania.

Gillanders, a nurseryman for over 50 years (now retired), and his wife Lesley started Woodbank Nursery on a bush block in Tasmania. Woodbank Nursery specialized in rare, exotic, unusual and native plants. As their nursery and its reputation grew so did their spectacular gardens containing many rare plants. Ken and Lesley collected seeds in Chile, Ecuador, New Zealand, China, South Africa, and Lesotho. Ken cultivated and propagated many Tasmanian natives including leatherwood cultivars.

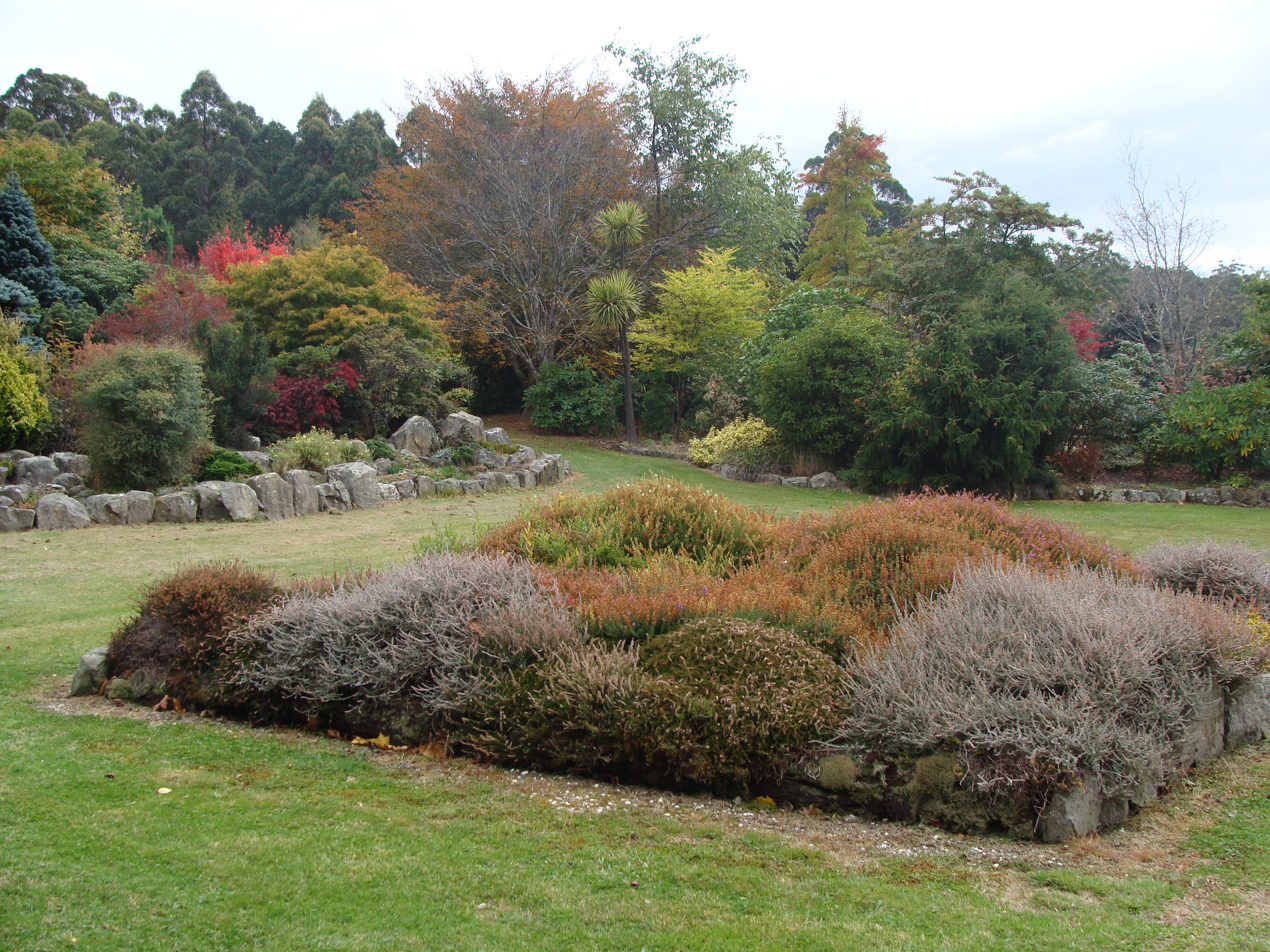
A view over the lower section of Woodbank Gardens (Formally known as Woodbank Nursery)

Gillanders has presented horticultural papers in the UK, Japan and New Zealand. He is co-author of "Know Your Rock Garden Plants and Dwarf Bulbs".

In 2002 Gillanders retired, and many Australian and overseas collectors were devastated, describing the nursery's closure as a "tragedy". Ken and Lesley stayed on in their garden of botanical treasures and have increased its size to cover over 5 acres (20,000 m^{2}). The two now travel overseas taking photos of plants in flower, instead of collecting seed. The nursery was known as Woodbank Gardens from 2003 to early 2012 and hosted small events on occasions. In early 2012 and Ken and Lesley sold their nursery to another private owner. In June 2004, on the Queen's Birthday, Ken was awarded an Order of Australia Medal for service to Horticulture. Ken is currently the Australian Rhododendron Registrar.
