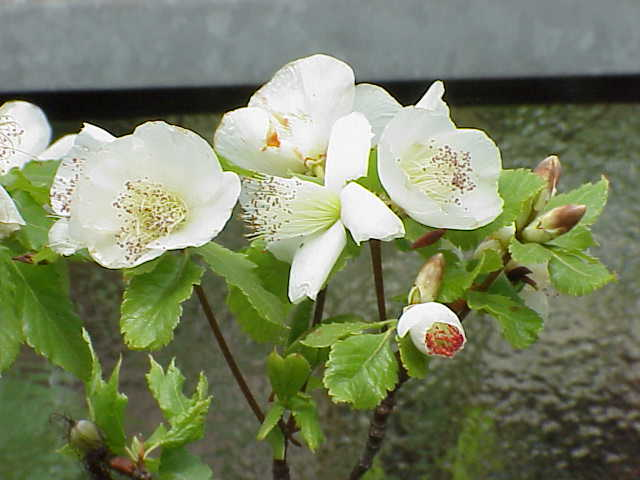

Conservation status
- Endangered (IUCN 3.1)

Scientific classification
- Kingdom: Plantae
- Clade: Embryophytes
- Clade: Tracheophytes
- Clade: Angiosperms
- Clade: Eudicots
- Clade: Rosids
- Order: Oxalidales
- Family: Cunoniaceae
- Genus: Eucryphia
- Species: E. glutinosa

Binomial name
- Eucryphia glutinosa (Poepp. & Endl.) Baill.

Synonyms
- Eucryphia pinnatifolia Gay; Fagus glutinosa Poepp. & Endl.

= Eucryphia glutinosa =

Species of plant

Eucryphia glutinosa, commonly known as brush bush, nirrhe, and guindo santo, is a species of flowering plant in the family Cunoniaceae. It is endemic to Chile, where it inhabits moist woodland habitats in the Maule, Ñuble, Biobio, and Araucania regions. It is a large deciduous shrub or small tree, growing to 10 m (33 ft) tall by 6 m (20 ft) wide, with glossy dark green leaves turning red in autumn. Single (or occasionally double) four-petalled, fragrant white flowers with prominent stamens appear in late summer.

The Latin specific epithet glutinosa means "sticky, glutinous".

The hardiest of its genus, it is a popular subject for cultivation in parks and gardens, valued for its foliage and late flowering. It requires moist, acidic soil with roots shaded from the sun. It has gained the Royal Horticultural Society's Award of Garden Merit.
