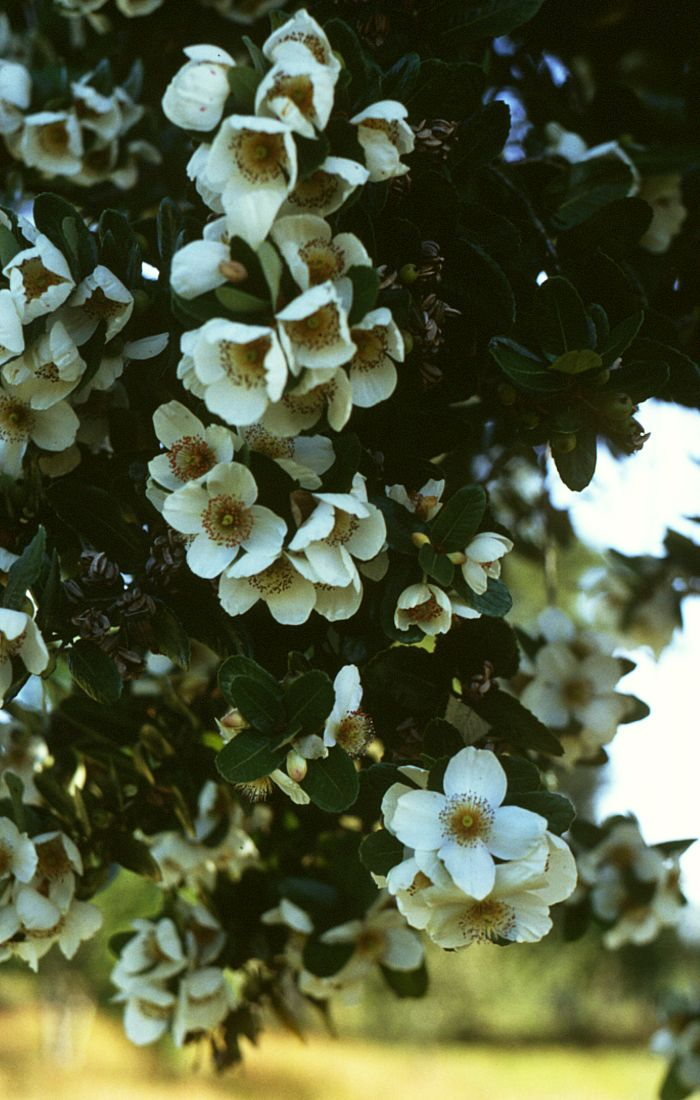

Conservation status
- Near Threatened (IUCN 2.3)

Scientific classification
- Kingdom: Plantae
- Clade: Embryophytes
- Clade: Tracheophytes
- Clade: Spermatophytes
- Clade: Angiosperms
- Clade: Eudicots
- Clade: Rosids
- Order: Oxalidales
- Family: Cunoniaceae
- Genus: Eucryphia
- Species: E. cordifolia

Binomial name
- Eucryphia cordifolia Cav.

Synonyms
- Eucryphia glutinosa (Poepp. & Endl.) Baill.; Eucryphia nymansensis J.Bausch; Eucryphia patagonica Speg.; Eucryphia pinnatifolia Gay; Fagus glutinosa Poepp. & Endl.

= Eucryphia cordifolia =

Species of tree

Eucryphia cordifolia, the ulmo, is a species of tree in the family Cunoniaceae. It is found in Chile and Argentina. It is threatened by logging and habitat loss. The natural habitat is along the Andes Range from 38 to 43°S, and up to 700 meters (2300 ft) above sea level. It is an exquisite tree with a thick trunk and broad crown and can become over 12 m (39 ft) high. It blooms in February and March, depending on latitude and altitude. The fruit is a capsule about 1.5 cm (0.6 in) in length.

== Cultivation and uses ==
Its flowers contain a highly appreciated aromatic nectar, harvested by introduced European bees and commercialized as ulmo honey (miel de Ulmo).

The wood is light brown to brown, heavy, moderately firm, rather hard and quite resistant to decay. It is used locally for construction and very extensively as firewood.

It grows well on the western coast of Scotland, UK, where several notable specimens exist, including possibly the most northerly cultivated example at Inverewe Garden. It dislikes cold winters. It can also be found in southern England and the island of Ireland. It has been planted in the North Pacific Coast of the United States.

=== Antibacterial properties of ulmo honey ===
Ulmo honey has been the subject of multiple peer-reviewed studies investigating its antibacterial activity. A 2010 comparative study by researchers at the Royal College of Surgeons in Ireland tested Ulmo 90 honey against medical-grade manuka honey (UMF 25+) and found that Ulmo honey had greater antibacterial activity against five clinical strains of methicillin-resistant Staphylococcus aureus (MRSA) than the manuka comparator, with minimum inhibitory concentrations of 3.1–6.3% v/v compared to 12.5% v/v for manuka. The two honeys showed comparable activity against Escherichia coli and Pseudomonas aeruginosa.

Subsequent research has characterised the chemistry underlying this activity. Velásquez et al. (2020) reported that monofloral ulmo honey contains phenolic acids (including gallic and caffeic acids) and flavonoids (including quercetin and rutin) at concentrations higher than several other monofloral honeys. Poulsen-Silva et al. (2023) found that the antibacterial activity of some ulmo honey samples persisted after enzymatic neutralisation of hydrogen peroxide, indicating that non-peroxide compounds also contribute to the observed activity.

== Chemical composition ==
Eucryphin, a chromone rhamnoside, can be isolated from the bark of E. cordifolia.
