= White box system =

A white box system is a mechanical system installed in the engine room of a ship for controlling and monitoring the engine room bilge water discharge from the vessel.

The system consists of all vital components for monitoring and controlling the discharge from the vessel's oily water separator. The white box includes a stainless steel cage with a locked door. The bilge water from the oily water separator is pumped through the white box and analyzed by an oil content meter. A flow switch secures that there is flow through the oil content meter and a flow meter counts the accumulated discharged overboard volume. If the door is opened, the oil content exceeds the legal limit of 15 parts per million (PPM) or the flow to the oil content meter is lost the three way valve will immediately redirect the bilge water back to the bilge water holding tank. All components inside the system are connected to a digital recorder mounted in the engine control room that records the oil content, three way valve position, flow through oil content meter, accumulated discharged volume, door position together with the vessels geographical position and time. The chief engineer possesses the key and when locked, the system cannot be tampered with and equally importantly provides the evidence that the vessel has been compliant. The recorder data is stored in an encrypted format and can be presented to any official body such as Port State Control, United States Coast Guard, Vetting or Classification society officials to prove that the vessel has been compliant to MARPOL 73/78 (the International Convention for the Prevention of Pollution From Ships) or any national regulation, and that no illegal discharge has been made.
