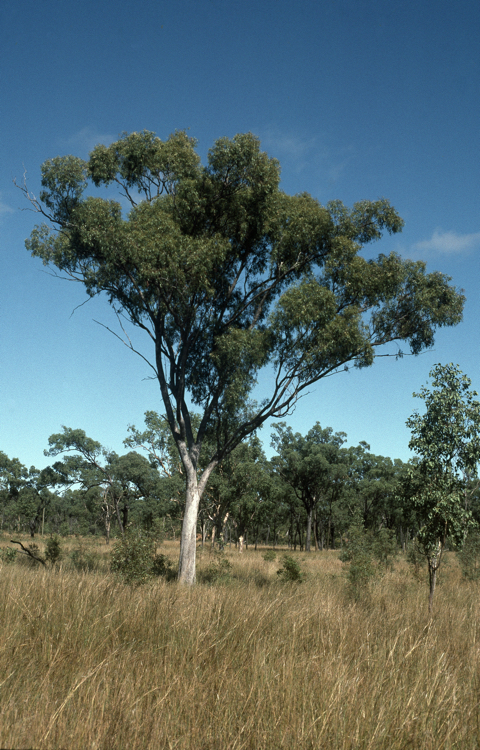

Scientific classification
- Kingdom: Plantae
- Clade: Embryophytes
- Clade: Tracheophytes
- Clade: Angiosperms
- Clade: Eudicots
- Clade: Rosids
- Order: Myrtales
- Family: Myrtaceae
- Genus: Eucalyptus
- Species: E. persistens

Binomial name
- Eucalyptus persistens L.A.S.Johnson & K.D.Hill

= Eucalyptus persistens =

Species of eucalyptus

Eucalyptus persistens is a species of small tree that is endemic to Queensland. It has rough, dark grey bark, lance-shaped adult leaves, flower buds in groups of seven, white flowers and cup-shaped or barrel-shaped fruit.

== Description ==
Eucalyptus persistens is a species of tree, rarely a mallee, that typically grows to a height of 12 m (39 ft) and forms a lignotuber. It has rough, dark grey bark on the trunk and branches. Young plants and coppice regrowth have dull, bluish, linear to narrow lance-shaped leaves that are 45–100 mm (1.8–3.9 in) long and 4–10 mm (0.16–0.39 in) wide. Adult leaves are lance-shaped, the same shade of green on both sides, 70–140 mm (2.8–5.5 in) long and 7–20 mm (0.28–0.79 in) wide, tapering to a petiole 5–17 mm (0.20–0.67 in) long. The flower buds are mostly arranged on the ends of branchlets on a branched peduncle in groups of seven. The peduncles are 5–12 mm (0.20–0.47 in) long, the individual buds on pedicels 2–7 mm (0.079–0.276 in) long. Mature buds are oval to pear-shaped, 3–6 mm (0.12–0.24 in) long and 2–3 mm (0.079–0.118 in) wide with a conical, rounded or beaked operculum. Flowering occurs between April and October and the flowers are white. The fruit is a woody, cup-shaped or barrel-shaped capsule, 3–5 mm (0.12–0.20 in) long and 3–4 mm (0.12–0.16 in) wide with the valves near rim level.

== Taxonomy ==
Eucalyptus persistens was first formally described in 1991 by Lawrie Johnson and Ken Hill in the journal Telopea, from material they collected in 1984. The specific epithet (persistens) is from Latin, meaning "persisting", referring to the outer operculum and rough bark.

== Distribution ==
This tree occurs in north-eastern Queensland between Laura, Mareeba, Hughenden, Forsayth and Marlborough.

== Conservation status ==
This eucalypt is listed as "least concern" under the Queensland Government Nature Conservation Act 1992

== See also ==
- List of Eucalyptus species
