= Australian Cultivar Registration Authority =

The ACRA logo

The Australian Cultivar Registration Authority (ACRA) is the International Cultivar Registration Authority (ICRA) for Australian plant genera, excluding those genera or groups for which other ICRAs have been appointed.

It is a committee of representatives of each state's botanic gardens, the Society for Growing Australian Plants, and the Nursery Industry Association of Australia.

Founded in 1963, it is responsible for the registration and publication of cultivar names of Australian native plants, in accordance with the International Code of Nomenclature for Cultivated Plants.

It also advises on plant breeders rights, and registers plant varieties declared under the Plant Breeder's Rights Act 1994.
