= Richard Hind Cambage =

Australian botanist (1859–1928)

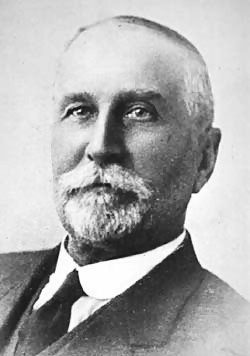
- Born: Richard Hind Cambage; 7 November 1859; Applegarth near Milton, New South Wales, Australia
- Died: 28 November 1928 (aged 69); Australia
- Education: Ulladulla Public School)
- Spouse: Fanny Skillman
- Scientific career
- Fields: surveying and botany
- Workplaces: Milton State School; Elizabeth Street registry office Department of Lands; Linnean Society of New South Wales

Richard Hind Cambage CBE (7 November 1859 – 28 November 1928) was an Australian surveyor and botanist who made important contributions to the description of the genera Acacia and Eucalyptus. In 1902, Cambage became the Chief Mining Surveyor. In 1916, he was made the Under-Secretary of the Mines Department. Cambage was also President of Royal Society of New South Wales. In 1925, he was appointed a Commander of the Order of the British Empire.

== Early life ==
Cambage was born on 7 November 1859 in Milton, New South Wales, Australia. He was the son of John Fisher Cambage and his wife Emma Ann Jones. Cambage attended Ulladulla Public School.

== Career ==
Cambage taught briefly at the school before he became an assistant surveyor in 1878. He was licensed as a surveyor in 1882. Cambage worked for the Lands Department as a draughtsman for three years and as a surveyor at the Department of Mines.

In 1902, he became the Chief Mining Surveyor. Cambage taught surveying at Sydney Technical College from 1909 to 1915. In 1916, he was made the Under-Secretary of the Mines Department.

Cambage retired from the public service in 1924. In the 1925 Birthday Honours, Cambage was appointed a Commander of the Order of the British Empire.

He was a member of the Linnean Society of New South Wales. He was President of the Institution of Surveyors, President of Royal Society of New South Wales and President of Pan-Pacific Science Congress. He was also President of the Australian Research Council.

Cambage contributed to a number of articles in the Journal of the Royal Society and described 130 species.

== Personal life and death ==
Cambage died on 28 November 1928. He was 69. He was buried at the Anglican cemetery in Rookwood.

He had been predeceased by his wife, Fanny née Skillman, whom he had married in 1881. He was survived by two sons and two daughters.

== Bibliography ==
- "R. H. CAMBAGE, ESQ., F.L.S." The Ulladulla and Milton Times. Sat 4 December 1909. Page 8.
