= List of Nature Conservation Act endangered flora of Queensland =

This is a list of the flora of Queensland listed as Endangered under the Nature Conservation Act 1992.

== A ==
- Acacia lumholtzii
- Acacia parvifoliolata
- Acacia pedleyi
- Acacia porcata
- Acacia ramiflora
- Acacia rubricola
- Acacia saxicola
- Acacia solenota
- Acacia sp. (Ruined Castle Creek P.I.Forster+ PIF17848)
- Acianthus saxatilis
- Acmena sp. (Cooper Creek P.I.Forster+ PIF15557)
- Acronychia littoralis
- Actephila bella
- Alectryon ramiflorus
- Alectryon repandodentatus
- Allocasuarina emuina
- Allocasuarina thalassoscopica
- Alsophila exilis
- Androcalva beeronensis
- Androcalva inglewoodensis
- Androcalva leiperi
- Androcalva pearnii
- Androcalva perkinsiana
- Apatophyllum olsenii
- Aponogeton bullosus
- Aponogeton lancesmithii
- Aponogeton proliferus
- Archidendron kanisii
- Archontophoenix myolensis
- Argophyllum ferrugineum
- Argophyllum palumense
- Aristida forsteri
- Aristida granitica
- Astrotricha roddii
- Aristida thompsonii
- Astonia australiensis
- Astrotricha roddii
- Atalaya collina
- Auranticarpa edentata
- Austromyrtus fragrantissima
- Austromyrtus gonoclada

== B ==
- Babingtonia granitica
- Babingtonia papillosa
- Babingtonia silvestris
- Bertya granitica
- Bertya recurvata
- Bertya sp. (Beeron Holding P.I.Forster+ PIF5753)
- Blandfordia grandiflora
- Boea kinnearii
- Boronia granitica
- Boronia repanda
- Brachychiton sp. (Blackwell Range R.J.Fensham 971)
- Bubbia queenslandiana queenslandiana
- Bulbophyllum blumei

== C ==
- Cajanus mareebensis
- Caladenia atroclavia
- Callicarpa thozetii
- Calochilus psednus
- Calotis suffruticosa
- Camptacra perdita
- Capparis humistrata
- Carronia pedicellata
- Cheilocostus potierae
- Chingia australis
- Chloris circumfontinalis
- Coix gasteenii
- Coleus acariformis
- Coleus habrophyllus
- Coleus nitidus
- Coleus omissus
- Coleus torrenticola
- Comesperma anemosmaragdinum
- Commersonia leiperi
- Cooktownia robertsii
- Corchorus cunninghamii
- Corunastylis tecta
- Cossinia australiana
- Costus potierae
- Crepidium lawleri
- Crepidomanes aphlebioides
- Croton caudatus
- Cyathea exilis
- Cyathea felina
- Cycas distans
- Cycas megacarpa
- Cycas ophiolitica
- Cycas semota
- Cymbonotus maidenii
- Cyperus cephalotes

== D ==
- Dallwatsonia felliana
- Davidsonia johnsonii
- Decaspermum sp. (Mt Morgan N.Hoy AQ455657)
- Dendrobium antennatum
- Dendrobium lithocola
- Dendrobium mirbelianum
- Dendrobium nindii
- Denhamia megacarpa
- Dinosperma longifolium
- Dioclea hexandra
- Diplazium pallidum
- Diploglottis campbellii
- Dipodium pictum
- Diuris curta

== E ==
- Eleocharis difformis
- Endiandra cooperana
- Endiandra floydii
- Endiandra wongawallanensis
- Eremochloa muricata
- Eriocaulon carsonii
- Eryngium fontanum
- Eucalyptus broviniensis
- Eucalyptus conglomerata
- Eucalyptus farinosa
- Eucalyptus nudicaulis
- Eucalyptus pachycalyx subsp. waajensis
- Eucalyptus taurina
- Eucalyptus sp. (Brovinia A.R.Bean 11911)
- Eucryphia jinksii
- Euodia pubifolia
- Euphrasia bella

== F - G ==
- Fimbristylis adjuncta
- Fimbristylis vagans
- Fontainea fugax
- Freycinetia marginata
- Gardenia actinocarpa
- Gaultheria viridicarpa
- Genoplesium tectum
- Glochidion pruinosum
- Glossocardia orthochaeta
- Gossia fragrantissima
- Graptophyllum reticulatum
- Grevillea linsmithii
- Gunniopsis sp. (Edgbaston R.J.Fensham 5094)

== H ==
- Habenaria chlorosepala
- Habenaria exilis
- Habenaria harroldii
- Habenaria macraithii
- Hakea macrorrhyncha
- Hedyotis novoguineensis
- Hemigenia clotteniana
- Hibbertia advena
- Homopholis belsonii
- Homoranthus zeteticorum
- Huperzia carinata
- Huperzia dalhousieana
- Huperzia filiformis
- Huperzia squarrosa

== I - K ==
- Isachne sharpii
- Jasminum jenniae
- Kardomia silvestris
- Kunzea sericothrix
- Kunzea truncata

== L ==
- Lasiopetalum sp. (Proston J.A.Baker 17)
- Leionema beckleri
- Leionema elatius subsp. beckleri
- Lenwebbia sp. (Blackall Range P.R.Sharpe 5387)
- Leptospermum barneyense
- Leucopogon sp. (Coolmunda D.Halford Q1635)
- Leucopogon recurvisepalus
- Lilaeopsis brisbanica
- Lindsaea terrae-reginae
- Lissanthe brevistyla
- Lobelia fenshamii

== M ==
- Macadamia jansenii
- Macrozamia cranei
- Macrozamia lomandroides
- Macrozamia pauli-guilielmi
- Macrozamia platyrhachis
- Macrozamia serpentina
- Macrozamia viridis
- Macrozamia sp. (Marlborough P.I.Forster+ PIF12269A)
- Mallotus megadontus
- Melaleuca irbyana
- Melaleuca sylvana
- Microcarpaea agonis
- Micromyrtus carinata
- Micromyrtus delicata
- Micromyrtus patula
- Muellerargia timorensis
- Mukia sp. (Longreach D.Davidson AQ279935)
- Murraya crenulata
- Musa jackeyi
- Myriophyllum sp. (Aramac B.A.Wilson 110)
- Myrsine serpenticola

== N - O ==
- Nepenthes mirabilis
- Nesaea robertsii
- Nicotiana wuttkei
- Noahdendron nicholasii
- Ochrosia moorei
- Oldenlandia gibsonii
- Oldenlandia spathulata
- Olearia hygrophila
- Olearia orientalis
- Olearia sp. (Glenavon P.I.Forster+ PIF15039)

== P ==
- Parsonsia largiflorens
- Parsonsia sankowskyana
- Peristylus banfieldii
- Phaius australis
- Phaius bernaysii
- Phaius tancarvilleae
- Phalaenopsis rosenstromii
- Phebalium distans
- Phlegmariurus carinatus
- Phlegmariurus pinifolius
- Pimelea approximans
- Planchonella eerwah
- Plectranthus nitidus
- Plectranthus omissus
- Plectranthus habrophyllus
- Plectranthus torrenticola
- Plesioneuron tuberculatum
- Pluchea alata
- Pluchea punctata
- Pneumatopteris pennigera
- Pomaderris clivicola
- Pomaderris coomingalensis
- Prostanthera clotteniana
- Prostanthera sp. (Dinden P.I.Forster+ PIF17342)
- Pterostylis caligna
- Pterostylis chaetophora
- Pterostylis scoliosa
- Ptilotus brachyanthus
- Ptilotus extenuatus
- Ptilotus uncinellus

== R ==
- Randia moorei
- Rhizanthella omissa
- Rhodamnia arenaria
- Rhodamnia dumicola
- Rhodamnia sessiliflora
- Rhodamnia whiteana
- Rhodomyrtus canescens
- Rhodomyrtus effusa
- Rhodomyrtus pervagata
- Ricinocarpos canianus
- Romnalda ophiopogonoides
- Rutidosis lanata

== S ==
- Salacistis ochroleuca
- Sankowskya stipularis
- Sarcochilus fitzgeraldii
- Sarcochilus weinthalii
- Scleromitrion gibsonii
- Solanum adenophorum
- Solanum dissectum
- Solanum elachophyllum
- Solanum graniticum
- Solanum johnsonianum
- Solanum mentiens
- Solanum orgadophilum
- Solanum papaverifolium
- Solanum unispinum
- Sphaeropteris felina
- Sporobolus pamelae
- Stackhousia sp. (McIvor River J.R.Clarkson 5201)
- Stylidium elachophyllum
- Styphelia recurvisepala
- Styphelia sp. (Coolmunda D.Halford Q1635)
- Symplocos crassiramifera
- Syzygium glenum

== T - V ==
- Tectaria devexa var. devexa
- Toechima pterocarpum
- Trioncinia retroflexa
- Triunia robusta
- Uncaria cordata
- Vincetoxicum forsteri, syn. Tylophora linearis
- Vincetoxicum rupicola, syn. Tylophora rupicola
- Vincetoxicum woollsii, syn. Tylophora woollsii
- Vittadania decora
- Vrydagzynea paludosa

== W - Z ==
- Westringia grandifolia
- Xanthostemon formosus
- Xerothamnella herbacea
- Zieria alata
- Zieria actites
- Zieria boolbunda
- Zieria bifida
- Zieria cephalophila
- Zieria eungellaensis
- Zieria exsul
- Zieria fordii
- Zieria gymnocarpa
- Zieria graniticola
- Zieria hydroscopica
- Zieria inexpectata
- Zieria madida
- Zieria scopulus
- Zieria vagans
- Zieria wilhelminae

- Zieria sp. (Binjour P.I.Forster PIF14134)
- Zieria sp. (Brolga Park A.R.Bean 1002)

== See also ==
- QLD Nature Conservation Act 1992
- List of Nature Conservation Act vulnerable flora of Queensland
- List of Nature Conservation Act rare flora of Queensland
- List of Nature Conservation Act endangered fauna of Queensland
- List of Nature Conservation Act extinct in the wild flora of Queensland
