= Solanum orgadophilum =

Conservation status
- Critically endangered (EPBC Act)

Scientific classification
- Kingdom: Plantae
- Clade: Embryophytes
- Clade: Tracheophytes
- Clade: Spermatophytes
- Clade: Angiosperms
- Clade: Eudicots
- Clade: Asterids
- Order: Solanales
- Family: Solanaceae
- Genus: Solanum
- Species: S. orgadophilum

Binomial name
- Solanum orgadophilum A.R.Bean

Species of shrub

Solanum orgadophilum is a prostrate sprawling to erect perennial shrub which is endemic to areas near Capella and Clermont in the Brigalow Belt North bioregion of Queensland, Australia.

== Conservation status ==
Solanum orgadophilum is listed as "critically endangered" under the Queensland Nature Conservation Act 1992. It is listed as "critically endangered" under the Australian Government Environment Protection and Biodiversity Conservation Act 1999.

== See also ==
- Solanum adenophorum
- Solanum dissectum
- Solanum elachophyllum
- Solanum johnsonianum
