= Pimelea approximans =

Conservation status
- Endangered (NCA)

Scientific classification
- Kingdom: Plantae
- Clade: Tracheophytes
- Clade: Angiosperms
- Clade: Eudicots
- Clade: Rosids
- Order: Malvales
- Family: Thymelaeaceae
- Genus: Pimelea
- Species: P. approximans

Binomial name
- Pimelea approximans A.R.Bean

Species of shrub

Pimelea approximans is a species of flowering plant in the family Thymelaeaceae and is endemic to northern Queensland. It is a perennial shrub with elliptic leaves and spikes of hairy, yellow, tube-shaped flowers.

== Description ==
Pimelea approximans is a perennial shrub that typically grows to a height of 50–60 cm (20–24 in) and has densely hairy young stems. The leaves are elliptic, mostly 25–35 mm (0.98–1.38 in) long and 5–11 mm (0.20–0.43 in) wide, on a petiole 1.5–1.8 mm (0.059–0.071 in) long. The flowers are borne in spikes of 50 to 130 on a densely hairy rachis 21–50 mm (0.83–1.97 in) long. The flowers are yellow, the floral tube 4.5–4.8 mm (0.18–0.19 in) long, the sepals 1.2–1.8 mm (0.047–0.071 in) long and densely hairy on the outside. Flowering occurs in May and June and the fruit contains a dark brown, oval seed 3.0–4.5 mm (0.12–0.18 in) long.

== Taxonomy ==
Pimelea approximans was first formally described in 2017 by Anthony Bean in the journal Austrobaileya from specimens collected at Ninian Bay in 1979. The specific epithet (approximans) refers to the similarity of this species to P. amabilis.

== Distribution and habitat ==
This pimelea grows on in woodland or grassland on rocky hillsides, in the Bathurst Bay and Coen areas of north Queensland.

== Conservation status ==
Pimelea approximans is listed as endangered under the Queensland Nature Conservation Act 1992.
