= Prostanthera clotteniana =

Conservation status
- Critically endangered (EPBC Act)

Scientific classification
- Kingdom: Plantae
- Clade: Tracheophytes
- Clade: Angiosperms
- Clade: Eudicots
- Clade: Asterids
- Order: Lamiales
- Family: Lamiaceae
- Genus: Prostanthera
- Species: P. clotteniana

Binomial name
- Prostanthera clotteniana (F.M.Bailey) A.R.Bean
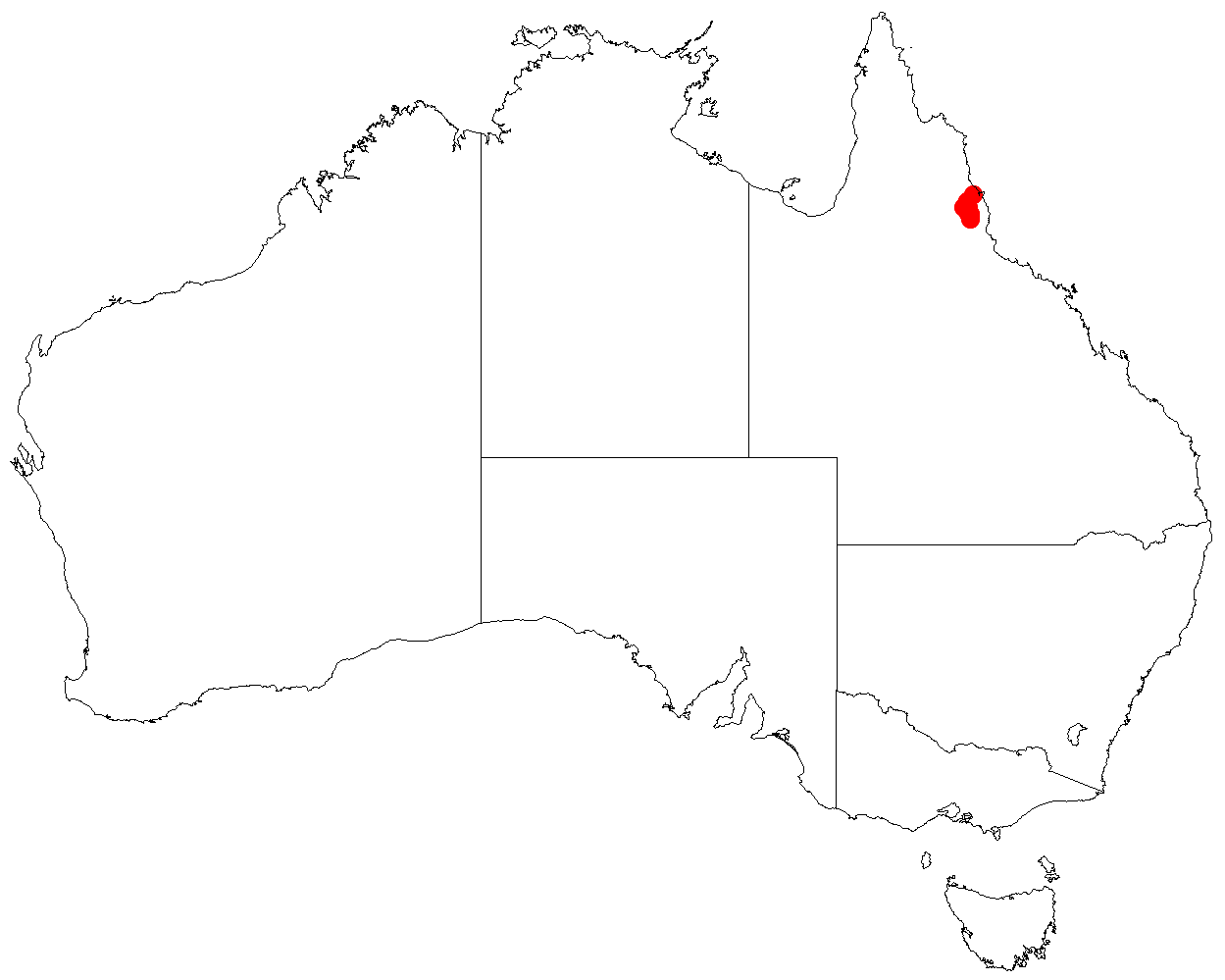
- Occurrence data from AVH

Synonyms
- Hemigenia clotteniana F.M.Bailey; Prostanthera atroviolacea F.M.Bailey

Species of flowering plant

Prostanthera clotteniana is a species of flowering plant in the family Lamiaceae and is endemic to tropical north Queensland. It is a shrub with cylindrical, hairy branches, narrow egg-shaped leaves with the narrower end towards the base, and purple to pale lilac flowers.

== Description ==
Prostanthera clotteniana is an erect shrub that typically grows to a height of 1.5 m (4 ft 11 in) with hairy, stems. The leaves are narrow elliptic to narrow egg-shaped with the narrower end towards the base, dull green, 19–20 mm (0.75–0.79 in) long and 3–6 mm (0.12–0.24 in) wide on a petiole 2.5–5.5 mm (0.098–0.217 in) long. The flowers are arranged singly in two to four leaf axils near the ends of branchlet, each flower with bracteoles 3–5.5 mm (0.12–0.22 in) long near the base of the sepals. The sepals form a tube 3–4 mm (0.12–0.16 in) long with two lobes, the lower lobe 2.5–3 mm (0.098–0.118 in) long and the upper lobe 4.5–6 mm (0.18–0.24 in) long. The petals are purple to pale lilac, 15–18 mm (0.59–0.71 in) long and fused to form a tube 8–12 mm (0.31–0.47 in) long, the lower central lobe 6–8 mm (0.24–0.31 in) long and bilobed. The lower side lobes are 3–5 mm (0.12–0.20 in) long and the upper lobes are 2.5–4.5 mm (0.098–0.177 in) long and fused with a small central notch.

== Taxonomy ==
In 1904, Frederick Manson Bailey formally described Hemigenia clotteniana in the Queensland Agricultural Journal and in 1905 described Prostanthera atroviolacea in the same journal, specimens of both plants collected near Herberton. In 2000, Anthony Bean considered the two names to be synonyms and raised the new name Prostanthera clotteniana in the journal Austrobaileya. The species was named "after F. E. Clotten, who furnished the funds for printing a general index to “The Queensland Flora”".

== Distribution and habitat ==
Prostanthera clotteniana grows in dry woodland on steep, rocky slopes in the Ravenshoe–Atherton area of north-east Queensland where it is only known from seven sites. It was thought to be extinct until rediscovered in 1999.

== Conservation status ==
This species is classified as "critically endangered" under the Australian Government Environment Protection and Biodiversity Conservation Act and the Queensland Government Nature Conservation Act 1992. The main threats to the species are inappropriate fire regimes and habitat disturbance caused by mining, illegal collection and weed invasion.
