= Solanum papaverifolium =

Conservation status
- Endangered (NCA)

Scientific classification
- Kingdom: Plantae
- Clade: Tracheophytes
- Clade: Angiosperms
- Clade: Eudicots
- Clade: Asterids
- Order: Solanales
- Family: Solanaceae
- Genus: Solanum
- Species: S. papaverifolium

Binomial name
- Solanum papaverifolium Symon

Species of shrub

Solanum papaverifolium is a prostrate sprawling herbaceous resprouting perennial forb which has been observed growing in areas between Jimbour and Warwick in Queensland. It has also been recorded in areas between Inverell, Quirindi and to the west at Narrabri and Moree in New South Wales.

== Conservation status ==
Solanum papaverifolium is listed as "endangered" under the Queensland Nature Conservation Act 1992. It is listed not listed under the Australian Government Environment Protection and Biodiversity Conservation Act 1999.
