= Ptilotus brachyanthus =

Conservation status
- Endangered (EPBC Act)

Scientific classification
- Kingdom: Plantae
- Clade: Tracheophytes
- Clade: Angiosperms
- Clade: Eudicots
- Order: Caryophyllales
- Family: Amaranthaceae
- Genus: Ptilotus
- Species: P. brachyanthus

Binomial name
- Ptilotus brachyanthus (F.Muell. ex Benth.) F.Muell.

Synonyms
- Ptilotus blakeanus Benl; Trichinium brachyanthum F.Muell. ex Benth.

Species of grass-like plant

Ptilotus brachyanthus is a species of flowering plant in the family Amaranthaceae and is endemic to Queensland. It was first formally described in 1870 by George Bentham who gave it the name Trichinium brachyanthum in Flora Australiensis from an unpublished description by Ferdinand von Mueller. In 1882, von Mueller transferred the species to Ptilotus as P. brachyanthus in his Systematic Census of Australian Plants.

There are two records of this species from pre-1900 and a few records from places between Augathella and Longreach in the 20th century, but it is only otherwise known from Mueller's type collection, presumably from the western Northern Territory.

Ptilotus brachyanthus is listed as "endangered" under the Queensland Government Nature Conservation Act 1992 and the Australian Government Environment Protection and Biodiversity Conservation Act 1999.

== See also ==
- List of Ptilotus species
