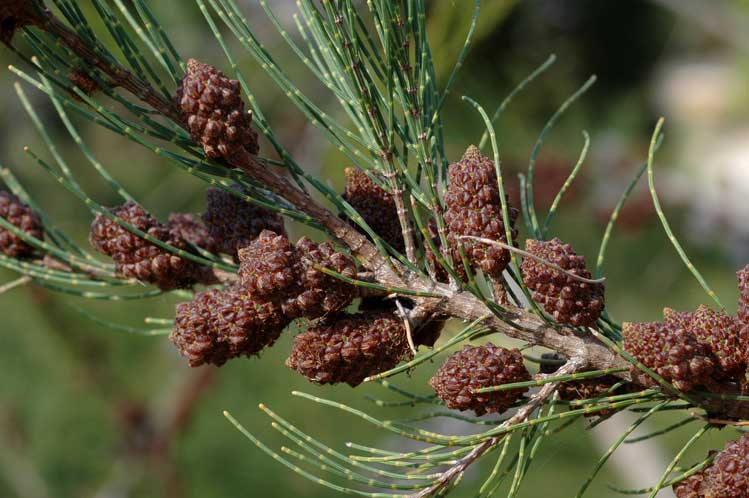

Conservation status
- Endangered (EPBC Act)

Scientific classification
- Kingdom: Plantae
- Clade: Tracheophytes
- Clade: Angiosperms
- Clade: Eudicots
- Clade: Rosids
- Order: Fagales
- Family: Casuarinaceae
- Genus: Allocasuarina
- Species: A. thalassoscopica

Binomial name
- Allocasuarina thalassoscopica L.A.S.Johnson
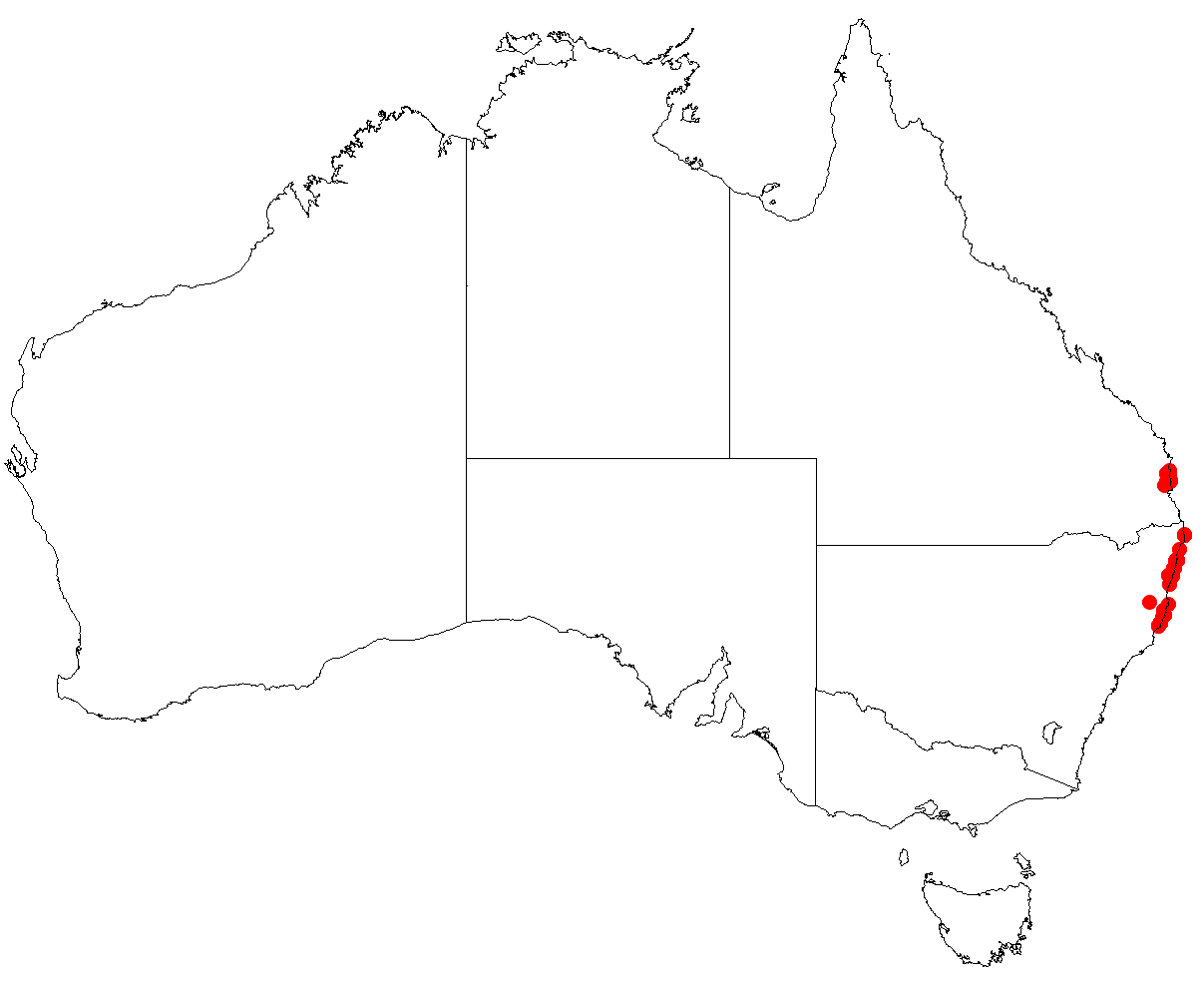
- Occurrence data from AVH

Synonyms
- Allocasuarina emuina L.A.S.Johnson; Casuarina sp. Mt Coolum (L.A.S.Johnson 8562); Casuarina sp. Mt Emu (P.R.Sharpe 2650)

= Allocasuarina thalassoscopica =

Species of flowering plant

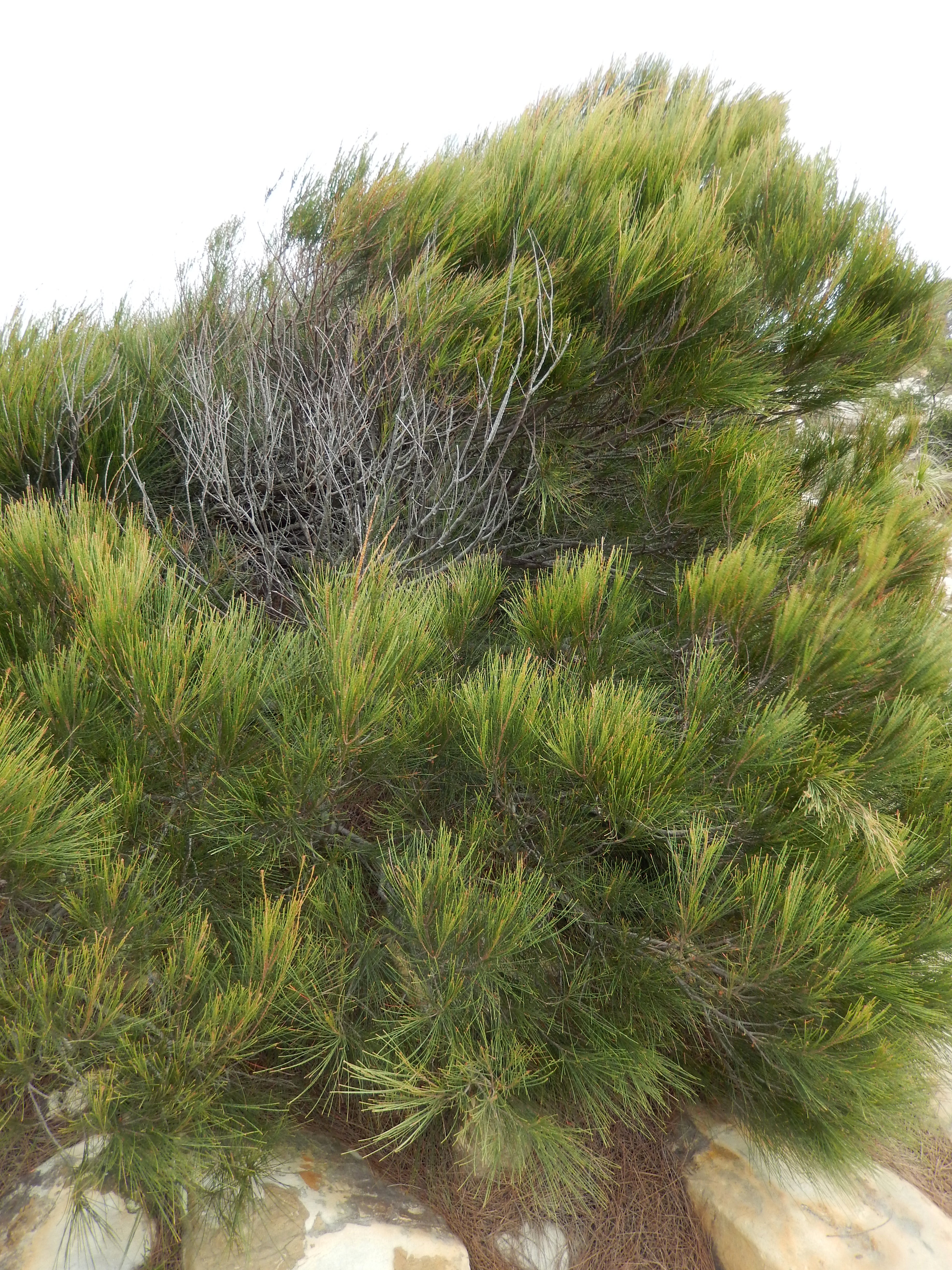
Habit on Mount Coolum

Allocasuarina thalassoscopica is a species of flowering plant in the family Casuarinaceae and is endemic to eastern Australia. It is a spreading to erect, dioecious shrub that has branchlets up to 180 mm (7.1 in) long, the leaves reduced to scales in whorls of five to seven, the fruiting cones 12–28 mm (0.47–1.10 in) long containing winged seeds 4.0–8.0 mm (0.16–0.31 in) long.

== Description ==
Allocasuarina thalassoscopica is a spreading to erect, dioecious shrub that typically grows to a height of 0.5–1.5 m (1 ft 8 in – 4 ft 11 in) and has smooth or fissured bark. Its branchlets are up to 120 mm (4.7 in) long, sometimes to 180 mm (7.1 in) long, the leaves reduced to scale-like teeth 0.3–0.6 mm (0.012–0.024 in) long, arranged in whorls of five to seven around the branchlets. The sections of branchlet between the leaf whorls are 3–12 mm (0.12–0.47 in) long, 0.5–0.9 mm (0.020–0.035 in) wide. Male flowers are arranged in spikes 5–45 mm (0.20–1.77 in) long, with mostly 6 to 10 whorls per centimetre (per 0.39 in.), the anthers 0.5–1.0 mm (0.020–0.039 in) long. Female cones are on a peduncle 3–14 mm (0.12–0.55 in) long, and mature cones 12–28 mm (0.47–1.10 in) long and 8–18 mm (0.31–0.71 in) in diameter, containing dark brown to blackish, winged seeds 4.0–8.0 mm (0.16–0.31 in) long.

== Taxonomy ==
Allocasuarina thalassoscopica was first described in 1989 by Lawrie Johnson in the Flora of Australia. The specific epithet, (thalassoscopica) means "sea-watcher", referring to its situation on a mountain slope, facing the sea.

== Distribution and habitat ==
This she-oak forms a dense, low, closed heath on the windswept south-facing upper slopes of Mount Coolum and along the coast from Noosa Heads in south-east Queensland to Diamond Beach in northern New South Wales.

== Conservation status ==
Allocasuarina thalassoscopica is listed as "endangered" under the Australian Government Environment Protection and Biodiversity Conservation Act 1999, and the Queensland Government Nature Conservation Act 1992. The main threats to the species are vegetation clearing and inappropriate fire regimes.
