= Zieria boolbunda =

Conservation status
- Vulnerable (NCA)

Scientific classification
- Kingdom: Plantae
- Clade: Tracheophytes
- Clade: Angiosperms
- Clade: Eudicots
- Clade: Rosids
- Order: Sapindales
- Family: Rutaceae
- Genus: Zieria
- Species: Z. boolbunda

Binomial name
- Zieria boolbunda Duretto & P.I.Forst.

Species of shrub

Zieria boolbunda is a plant in the citrus family Rutaceae and is only known from an area near Mount Perry in Queensland. It is a dense, compact shrub with wiry branches, three-part, clover-like leaves and pinkish-cream flowers in small groups, each flower with four petals and four stamens.

== Description ==
Zieria boolbunda is a densely compact shrub which grows to a height of 1 m (3 ft). It has wiry branches that are rough due to the remains of old leaf bases and are covered with warty glands. The leaves have a petiole 5–10 mm (0.2–0.4 in) and are divided, clover-like into three leaflets. The centre leaflet is elliptic in shape, 11–25 mm (0.4–1 in) long and 3.5–8 mm (0.1–0.3 in) wide and the others are similar but slightly smaller. The leaflets are flat and there is a distinct midvein on the lower surface but otherwise the leaf veins are difficult to see.

The flowers are pinkish-cream in colour and are arranged in leaf axils in groups of about seven on a stalk 4–15 mm (0.2–0.6 in) long. The groups are about the same length or shorter than the leaves and usually only one to three flowers are open at the same time. The sepals are triangular, about 1 mm (0.04 in) long and wide and the four petals are elliptical in shape, about 2.5 mm (0.1 in) long and 1.5 mm (0.06 in) wide. The petals are dotted with clear glands and the outside is more or less hairy. The four stamens are about 1.5 mm (0.06 in) long. Flowering mainly occurs in May and is followed by fruit which is a glabrous capsule, 3 mm (0.1 in) long and about 2 mm (0.08 in) wide.

== Taxonomy and naming ==
Zieria boolbunda was first formally described in 2007 by Marco Duretto and Paul Irwin Forster from a specimen collected on Boolbunda Rock near Mount Perry and Boolboonda in the Burnett district. The description was published in Austrobaileya and the specific epithet (boolbunda) refers to "the picturesque and imposing rock this species appears to be restricted to."

== Distribution and habitat ==
This zieria grows in crevices in granite outcrops in woodland or heath above 600 m (2,000 ft). It is only known from Boolbunda Rock and surrounds, north-east of Mount Perry.

== Conservation status ==
Zieria boolbunda is listed as "vulnerable" under the Queensland Government Nature Conservation Act 1992.
