= Pterostylis scoliosa =

Small kinked greenhood

Scientific classification
- Kingdom: Plantae
- Clade: Tracheophytes
- Clade: Angiosperms
- Clade: Monocots
- Order: Asparagales
- Family: Orchidaceae
- Subfamily: Orchidoideae
- Tribe: Cranichideae
- Genus: Pterostylis
- Species: P. scoliosa

Binomial name
- Pterostylis scoliosa D.L.Jones

Synonyms
- Diplodium scoliosum (D.L.Jones) D.L.Jones & M.A.Clem.

Species of orchid

Pterostylis scoliosa, commonly known as the small kinked greenhood, is a species of orchid endemic to Queensland. As with similar greenhoods, the flowering plants differ from those which are not flowering. The non-flowering plants have a rosette of leaves flat on the ground but the flowering plants have a single flower with leaves on the flowering stem. This greenhood has a white, pale green and pale brown flower with a kinked or curved labellum protruding above the sinus between the lateral sepals.

== Description ==
Pterostylis scoliosa is a terrestrial, perennial, deciduous, herb with an underground tuber and when not flowering, a rosette of shiny green leaves lying flat on the ground. Each leaf is 7–21 mm (0.3–0.8 in) long and 6–14 mm (0.2–0.6 in) wide. Flowering plants have a single flower 19–22 mm (0.7–0.9 in) long and 6–8 mm (0.2–0.3 in) wide which leans slightly forwards on a flowering stem 100–200 mm (4–8 in) high with between three and five spreading stem leaves. The flower is white, pale green and pale brown. The dorsal sepal and petals are fused, forming a hood or "galea" over the column, the dorsal sepal with a thread-like tip 4–5 mm (0.16–0.20 in) long. The lateral sepals are fused near their base, partly closing off the front of the flower and have erect, thread-like tips 14–16 mm (0.55–0.63 in) long. The sinus between the lateral sepals bulges slightly and is V-shaped. The labellum is 11–13 mm (0.4–0.5 in) long, 3–4 mm (0.1–0.2 in) wide and is sharply kinked or curved, tapered near the tip and protrudes prominently above the sinus. Flowering occurs from March to May.

== Taxonomy and naming ==
Pterostylis scoliosa was first formally described in 1997 by David Jones from a specimen collected in the Brisbane Forest Park by Cecil Ralph Crane. The description was published in Proceedings of the Linnean Society of New South Wales. The specific epithet (scoliosa) is derived from the Ancient Greek word skolios meaning "curved", "bent" or "oblique".

== Distribution and habitat ==
The small kinked greenhood grows on steep, rocky slopes in open forest, often near streams. It is only known from the Brisbane Forest Park.

== Conservation ==
Pterostylis scoliosa is classified as "endangered" under the Queensland Government Nature Conservation Act 1992.
