= Ptilotus uncinellus =

Conservation status
- Endangered (EPBC Act)

Scientific classification
- Kingdom: Plantae
- Clade: Embryophytes
- Clade: Tracheophytes
- Clade: Spermatophytes
- Clade: Angiosperms
- Clade: Eudicots
- Order: Caryophyllales
- Family: Amaranthaceae
- Genus: Ptilotus
- Species: P. uncinellus

Binomial name
- Ptilotus uncinellus (Anthony Bean) T.Hammer

Species of plant

Ptilotus uncinellus is a species of flowering plant of the family Amaranthaceae and is endemic to northern Queensland, Australia. It is a prostrate annual herb with many stems radiating from a central rootstock, egg-shaped to diamond-shaped leaves, and sessile, pale brown cylindrical spikes of flowers.

== Description ==
Ptilotus uncinellus is a prostrate, annual herb with many stems up to 1.2 m (3 ft 11 in) long, radiating from a central rootstock. Mature plants have egg-shaped to diamond-shaped, glabrous leaves 30–70 mm (1.2–2.8 in) long, 13–30 mm (0.51–1.18 in) wide and sessile or on a petiole up to 12 mm (0.47 in) long. The flowers are borne in sessile cylindrical spikes in leaf axils, with a narrowly egg-shaped bract 1.5–2.0 mm (0.059–0.079 in) long and 0.7–0.8 mm (0.028–0.031 in) wide for each flower, and two glabrous bracteoles 2.4–2.8 mm (0.094–0.110 in) long and 1.0–1.5 mm (0.039–0.059 in) wide, both with a prominent midrib. There are five narrowly oblong to narrowly elliptic tepals 2.3–2.8 mm (0.091–0.110 in) long, and 0.4–0.5 mm (0.016–0.020 in) wide. There are two stamens and three staminodes, the style is straight, 0.4–0.6 mm (0.016–0.024 in) long and the ovary is sessile, broadly lens-shaped, 0.8–1.0 mm (0.031–0.039 in) long. Flowering has been recorded from April to June and the fruits are lens-shaped, about 1.5 mm (0.059 in) in diameter with a seed about 1.1 mm (0.043 in) in diameter with a thin, custy covering.

== Taxonomy ==
This species was first formally described in 2010 by Anthony Bean who gave it the name Kelita uncinella in the journal Muelleria from specimens he collected near the Newlands coal mine in 2009. In 2019, Tim Hammer transferred the species to Ptilotus as P. uncinellus in the journal Taxon. The specific epithet (uncinellus) means 'with small hooks', referring to the small hooks on the tepal ends.

== Distribution and habitat ==
This species of Ptilotus is only known from near the Newlands coal mine about 130 km (81 mi) west of Mackay in north Queensland, where it mainly grows on the south-facing slopes of "jump-ups" in Acacia shirleyi woodland with an understorey of scrub species.

== Conservation status ==
Ptilotus uncinellus is listed as 'endangered' under the Australian Government Environment Protection and Biodiversity Conservation Act 1999 and the Queensland Government Nature Conservation Act 1992.
