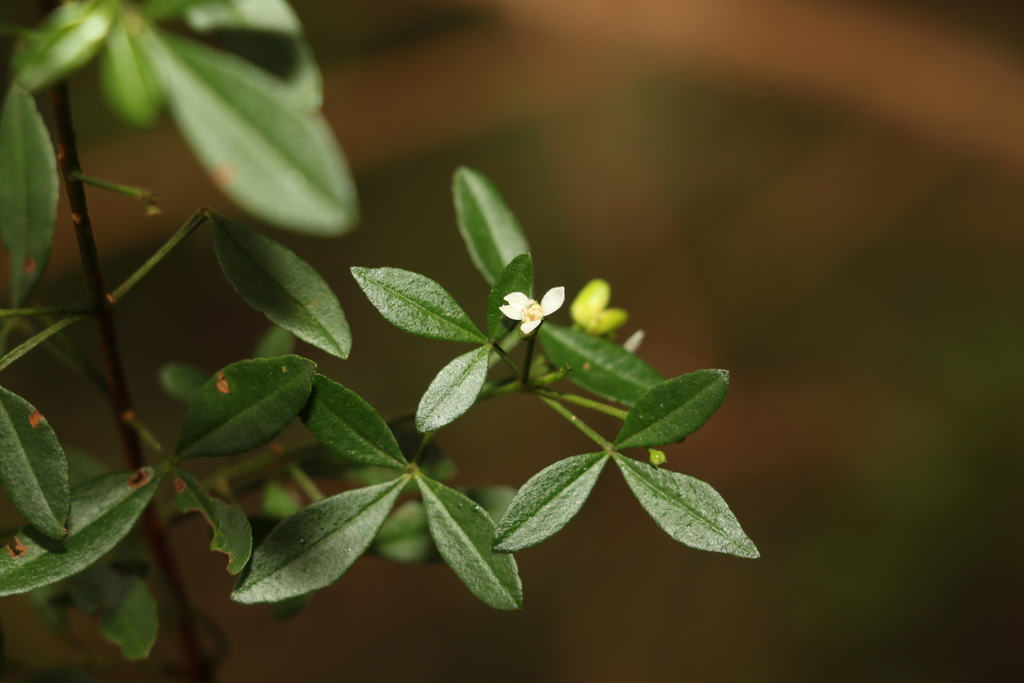
- Near Flinders Peak

Conservation status
- Critically Endangered (NCA)

Scientific classification
- Kingdom: Plantae
- Clade: Tracheophytes
- Clade: Angiosperms
- Clade: Eudicots
- Clade: Rosids
- Order: Sapindales
- Family: Rutaceae
- Genus: Zieria
- Species: Z. scopulus

Binomial name
- Zieria scopulus Duretto & P.I.Forst.

= Zieria scopulus =

Species of shrub

Zieria scopulus, commonly known as Flinders Peak stink bush, is a plant in the citrus family Rutaceae and endemic to south-eastern Queensland. It is an open, compact shrub with wiry branches, three-part leaves and groups of up to twenty white flowers with four petals and four stamens, although only a small number of flowers are open at the same time. It is only known from two peaks of volcanic rock near Ipswich.

== Description ==
Zieria scopulus is an open, compact shrub which grows to a height of 1 m (3 ft) or more and has wiry branches. The leaves are composed of three more or less elliptic leaflets, the central leaflet one 11–23 mm (0.4–0.9 in) long and 3–9 mm (0.1–0.4 in) wide. The leaves have a petiole 5–11 mm (0.2–0.4 in) long. The sides of the leaflets are wavy, especially near the tip. The flowers are arranged in groups of up to twenty in leaf axils, although only one to three are open at the same time. The groups are on a stalk 4–18 mm (0.2–0.7 in) long. The flowers are surrounded by scale-like bracts which remain during flowering. The sepals are triangular, about 1 mm (0.04 in) long and wide and the four petals are white, elliptic in shape, about 2 mm (0.08 in) long and 1.5 mm (0.06 in) wide with star-like hairs on the outer surface. There are four stamens. Flowering occurs in May and June and is followed by fruit which are smooth, glabrous capsules 3 mm (0.1 in) long and about 2 mm (0.08 in) wide.

== Taxonomy and naming ==
Zieria scopulus was first formally described in 2007 by Marco Duretto and Paul Irwin Forster from a specimen collected from Mount Elliot near Ipswich and the description was published in the journal Austrobaileya. The specific epithet (scopulus) is a Latin word meaning "projecting rock, shelf, ledge or cliff" referring to the habitat of this species.

== Distribution and habitat ==
This zieria is only known from Mount Elliot and Flinders Peak near Ipswich where it grows in stony cracks and crevices of trachyte.

== Conservation Status ==
Zieria scopulus is listed as "critically endangered" under the Queensland Nature Conservation Act 1992. It was changed from vulnerable to critically endangered in 2020 by the Queensland Government. It is not classified under the Australian Government Environment Protection and Biodiversity Conservation Act 1999
