= Zieria inexpectata =

Conservation status
- Endangered (NCA)

Scientific classification
- Kingdom: Plantae
- Clade: Tracheophytes
- Clade: Angiosperms
- Clade: Eudicots
- Clade: Rosids
- Order: Sapindales
- Family: Rutaceae
- Genus: Zieria
- Species: Z. inexpectata

Binomial name
- Zieria inexpectata Duretto & P.I.Forst.

Species of shrub

Zieria inexpectata is a plant in the citrus family Rutaceae and endemic to south-eastern Queensland. It is a small, compact shrub with erect, wiry branches, three-part leaves and groups of up to twelve white flowers, the groups longer than the leaves and the flowers with four petals and four stamens. It was unexpectedly discovered by the authors during a field trip and its discovery led to a paper describing the zierias of Queensland, including sixteen new species.

== Description ==
Zieria inexpectata is a shrub which grows to a height of 50 cm (20 in) and has erect, wiry branches with scattered hairs. The leaves are composed of three narrow elliptic to narrow lance-shaped leaflets with the narrower end towards the base. The leaves have a petiole 1–2 mm (0.04–0.08 in) long and the central leaflet is 4–7 mm (0.2–0.3 in) long and 1–3 mm (0.04–0.1 in) wide. Both sides of the leaflets are slightly hairy. The flowers are white and are arranged in groups of up to twelve in leaf axils, the groups on a stalk 4–11 mm (0.2–0.4 in) long. The sepals are egg-shaped to triangular, 1–2 mm (0.04–0.08 in) long and about 1 mm (0.04 in) wide and the four petals are elliptic in shape, 2–3 mm (0.08–0.1 in) long and about 2 mm (0.08 in) wide, sparsely hairy on the upper surface and densely hairy below. The four stamens are about 1 mm (0.04 in) long. Flowering occurs from March to November and is followed by fruit from June which is a more or less glabrous capsule about 3 mm (0.1 in) long and 2 mm (0.08 in) wide.

== Taxonomy and naming ==
Zieria inexpectata was first formally described in 2007 by Marco Duretto and Paul Irwin Forster from a specimen collected near Gayndah and the description was published in Austrobaileya. The specific epithet (inexpectata) refers to the unexpected discovery of this species whilst the authors were studying an undescribed species of Boronia on a field trip. The discovery lead to a paper on the zierias of Queensland, including sixteen new species.

== Distribution and habitat ==
This zieria grows in sandy soil in woodland in south-east Queensland, including the central Burnett district, and near Proston and Wondai.

== Conservation ==
Zieria inexpectata is classed as "endangered" under the Queensland Nature Conservation Act 1992.
