= Alsophila exilis =

Conservation status
- Endangered (NCA)

Scientific classification
- Kingdom: Plantae
- Clade: Embryophytes
- Clade: Tracheophytes
- Division: Polypodiophyta
- Class: Polypodiopsida
- Order: Cyatheales
- Family: Cyatheaceae
- Genus: Alsophila
- Species: A. exilis

Binomial name
- Alsophila exilis (Holttum) Lehnert

Synonyms
- Cyathea exilis Holttum; Alsophila exilis (Holttum) A.R.Field, comb. superfl.

Species of fern

Alsophila exilis, synonym Cyathea exilis, is a species of tree fern endemic to the Cape York Peninsula in Queensland, Australia, where it grows in vine forest on a substrate of sandstone. It is a rare plant known only from one location, specifically by a stream in Mann Creek in the William Thompson Range. In its natural habitat, A. exilis is reportedly accompanied by Pandanus and Calamus plants. The trunk is erect, up to 4 m tall and 4–8 cm in diameter. It produces several buds, often one at each stipe base. Fronds are bipinnate and up to 1 m long. The rachis and stipe range in colour from brown to dark brown or black-brown and are covered in blunt spines and scales. The scales are dull brown in colour and bear terminal setae, mostly one each. Sori are round and occur on either side of the pinnule midvein. Indusia are absent.
