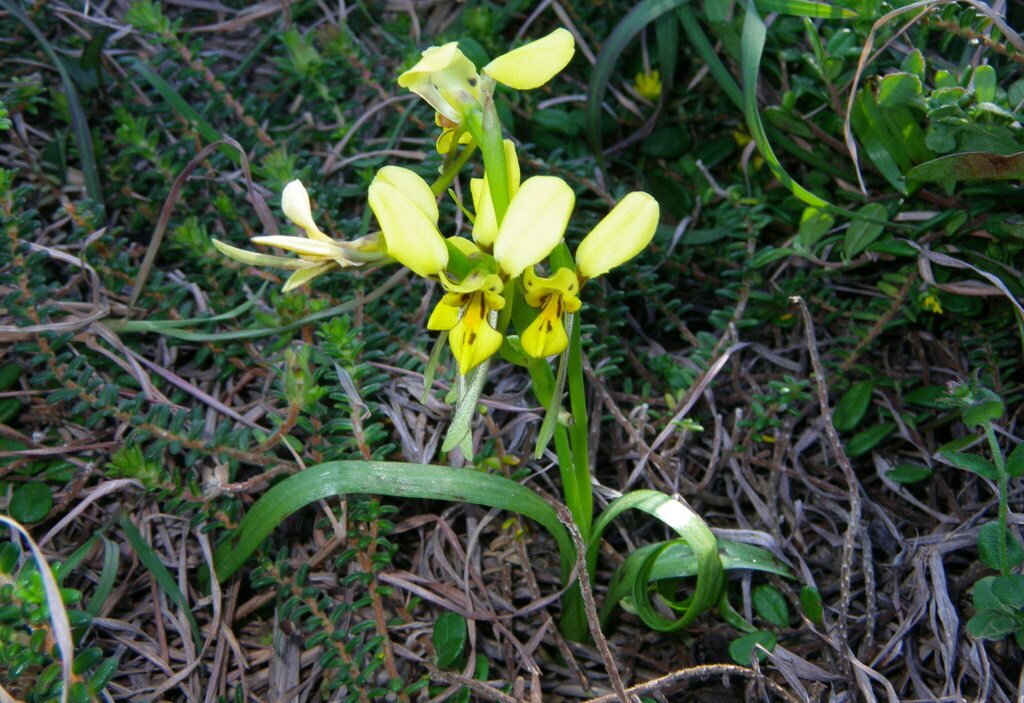
- Near Coffs Harbour

Scientific classification
- Kingdom: Plantae
- Clade: Embryophytes
- Clade: Tracheophytes
- Clade: Angiosperms
- Clade: Monocots
- Order: Asparagales
- Family: Orchidaceae
- Subfamily: Orchidoideae
- Tribe: Diurideae
- Genus: Diuris
- Species: D. curta

Binomial name
- Diuris curta D.L.Jones

= Diuris curta =

Species of orchid

Diuris curta is a species of orchid that is endemic to eastern Australia. It has one or two leaves and up to five bright yellow flowers with two small dark spots on the dorsal sepal. It grows on coastal headlands between about Byfield in Queensland and Hat Head in New South Wales.

== Description ==
Diuris curta is a tuberous, perennial herb with one or more usually two linear leaves 150–250 mm (6–10 in) long, 5–8 mm (0.2–0.3 in) wide and folded lengthwise. Up to five bright yellow flowers 20–30 mm (0.8–1 in) wide are borne on a flowering stem 50–200 mm (2–8 in) tall. The dorsal is egg-shaped to almost round, 9–14 mm (0.4–0.6 in) long and 7–10 mm (0.3–0.4 in) wide with two small dark spots. The lateral sepals are greenish, egg-shaped to spatula-shaped with the narrower end towards the base, 13–22 mm (0.5–0.9 in) long, 3–5 mm (0.1–0.2 in) wide and turned downwards, parallel to or crossed over each other. The petals are more or less erect or curved backwards, broadly egg-shaped, 9–15 mm (0.4–0.6 in) long and 7–10 mm (0.3–0.4 in) wide on a blackish stalk 4–5 mm (0.16–0.20 in) long. The labellum is 10–12 mm (0.39–0.47 in) long and has three lobes. The centre lobe is egg-shaped to wedge-shaped, 7–11 mm (0.3–0.4 in) long and 8–12 mm (0.3–0.5 in) wide and the side lobes are oblong to egg-shaped, 3–5 mm (0.1–0.2 in) long and 2–3.5 mm (0.08–0.1 in) wide. There are two callus ridges 5–6 mm (0.20–0.24 in) long and spreading apart from each other near the mid-line of the labellum. Flowering occurs from August to early October.

== Taxonomy and naming ==
Diuris curta was first formally described in 2006 by David Jones from a specimen collected near Hat Head and the description was published in Australian Orchid Research. The specific epithet (curta) is a Latin word meaning "short", referring to the short habit of this orchid, which is probably a result of adaptation to the exposed environment.

== Distribution and habitat ==
This orchid grows on coastal headlands between Byfield and Hat Head, often in places exposed to the sea.

== Conservation ==
Invasion by weeds including bitou bush and native shrubs in the absence of fire threaten D. curta.
