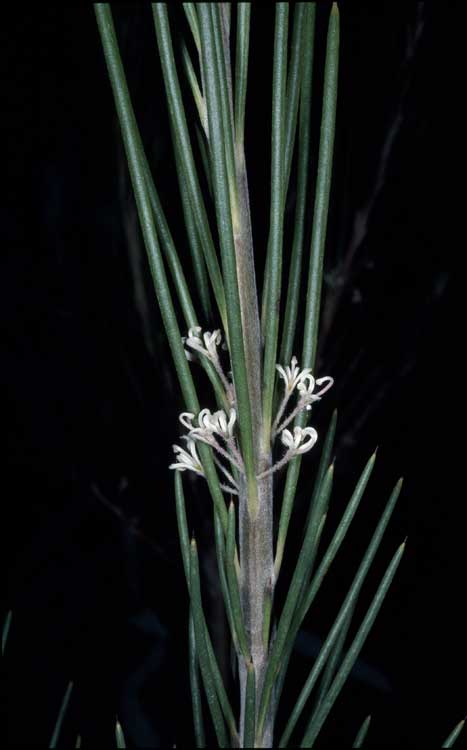
- Hakea macrorrhyncha flowers in the Australian National Botanic Gardens

Conservation status
- Rare (NCA)

Scientific classification
- Kingdom: Plantae
- Clade: Tracheophytes
- Clade: Angiosperms
- Clade: Eudicots
- Order: Proteales
- Family: Proteaceae
- Genus: Hakea
- Species: H. macrorrhyncha

Binomial name
- Hakea macrorrhyncha W.R.Barker
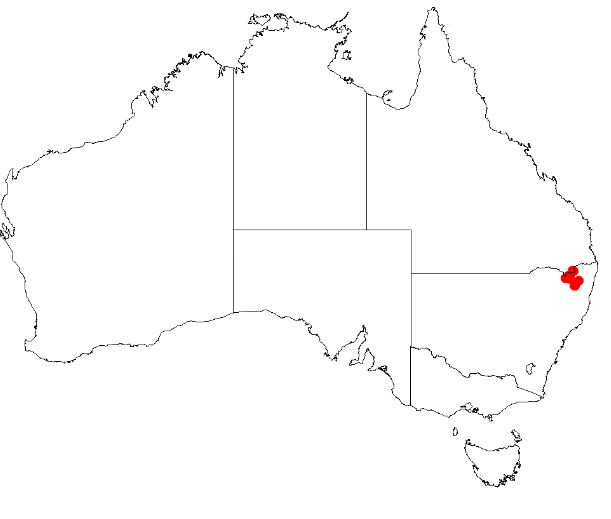
- Occurrence data from AVH

= Hakea macrorrhyncha =

Species of shrub native to Australia

Hakea macrorrhyncha is a shrub in the family Proteaceae native to Australia. A restricted species of north-eastern New South Wales and south-eastern Queensland.

== Description ==
Hakea macrorrhyncha is an erect shrub or small tree, single-stemmed or forked close to the ground 1.8–6 m (6–20 ft) high. Branchlets are densely covered with short soft matted hairs and remain until flowering. Needle-like leaves are often grooved below 4.5–9 cm (2–4 in) long and 0.9–1.5 mm (0.04–0.06 in) wide. They appear white initially and densely covered with matted hairs becoming smooth without hairs. An inflorescence of 3−4 flowers appear in leaf axils. The main stalk is rounded, 0.5–0.7 mm (0.02–0.03 in) long and covered with white woolly hairs. The individual white flower stalks are 4–5.5 mm (0.2–0.2 in) long and moderately covered with soft matted hairs. The short cream-white sepals and petals are 3–3.8 mm (0.1–0.1 in) long, moderately to densely covered with white soft short hairs. The style is 6.5–8 mm (0.3–0.3 in) long and recurved. Laterally broad egg-shaped fruit 35–45 mm (1–2 in) long, 21-25 or up to 30 mm wide with a network of wrinkled veins with small blister-like protuberances on a smooth surface, tapering to a long-triangular beak. Cream-white flowers appear from August to September.

== Taxonomy and naming ==
Hakea macrorrhyncha was first formally described in 1996 by William Barker and the description was published in Journal of the Adelaide Botanic Garden. The specific epithet is derived from Greek macro- meaning "long" and rhynch- meaning "nose" or "beak", referring to the long beak of the fruit.

== Distribution and habitat ==
Hakea macrorrhyncha is a restricted to the Torrington area of north-eastern N.S.W and nearby Girraween National Park and surrounds in south-eastern Queensland. It grows in hilly granitic locations of open forest or low woodland.

== Conservation status ==
Hakea macrorrhyncha is classified as rare under Queensland's Nature Conservation (Wildlife) Regulation 2006.
