= Solanum mentiens =

Conservation status
- Endangered (NCA)

Scientific classification
- Kingdom: Plantae
- Clade: Tracheophytes
- Clade: Angiosperms
- Clade: Eudicots
- Clade: Asterids
- Order: Solanales
- Family: Solanaceae
- Genus: Solanum
- Species: S. mentiens

Binomial name
- Solanum mentiens A.R.Bean

Species of shrub

Solanum mentiens is a stoloniferous pennerial which is endemic to areas of Boonah and Beenleigh in far South-East Queensland, Australia.

== Distribution & habitat ==
This species inhabits notophyll vineforest dominated by Araucaria.

== Conservation status ==
Solanum mentiens is listed as "endangered" under the Queensland Nature Conservation Act 1992. It is not listed under the Australian Government Environment Protection and Biodiversity Conservation Act 1999.
