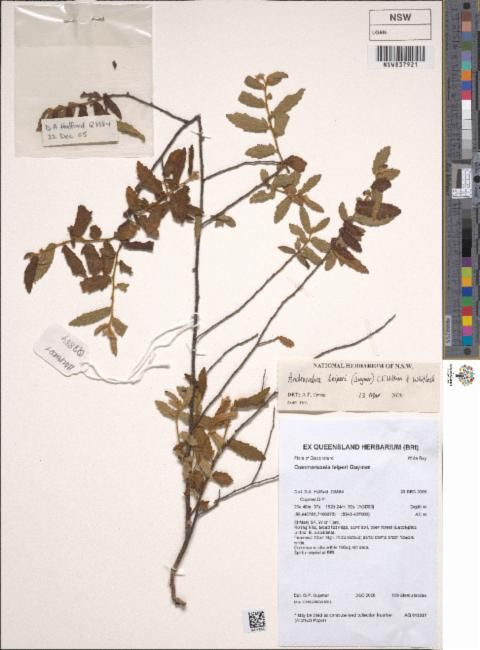
- Isotype in the National Herbarium of New South Wales

Conservation status
- Endangered (NCA)

Scientific classification
- Kingdom: Plantae
- Clade: Embryophytes
- Clade: Tracheophytes
- Clade: Spermatophytes
- Clade: Angiosperms
- Clade: Eudicots
- Clade: Rosids
- Order: Malvales
- Family: Malvaceae
- Genus: Androcalva
- Species: A. leiperi

Binomial name
- Androcalva leiperi (Guymer) C.F.Wilkins & Whitlock

Synonyms
- Commersonia leiperi Guymer

= Androcalva leiperi =

Species of shrub

Androcalva leiperi, also known as Leiper's commersonia, is a species of flowering plant in the family Malvaceae and is endemic to a restricted part of south-east Queensland. It is an erect or prostrate shrub that has brown bark, lance-shaped leaves with 4 to 7 pairs of rounded serrations on the edges, and groups of 3 to 12 white flowers.

== Description ==
Androcalva leiperi is an erect or prostrate shrub that typically grows to 0.2–1 m (7.9 in – 3 ft 3.4 in) high and 0.5–1 m (1 ft 8 in – 3 ft 3 in) wide, and that forms suckers. Its bark is brown, its branchlets covered with golden, star-shaped hairs. The leaves are lance-shaped, 15–115 mm (0.59–4.53 in) long and 4–16 mm (0.16–0.63 in) wide on a petiole 1–3 mm (0.039–0.118 in) long with narrowly triangular stipules 1–4 mm (0.039–0.157 in) long at the base. The edges of the leaves have 4 to 7 pairs of rounded serrations on the edges and both surfaces of the leaves are covered with golden, star-shaped hairs. The flowers are arranged in groups of 3 to 12 on a peduncle 3–10 mm (0.12–0.39 in) long, each flower on a pedicel 1–4 mm (0.039–0.157 in) long, with bracts 1–2 mm (0.039–0.079 in) long at the base. The flowers are pink in the bud stage, then white and 4.5–5.5 mm (0.18–0.22 in) in diameter with 5 petal-like sepals, the lobes 1.5–1.6 mm (0.059–0.063 in) long. The petals are 1.7–1.9 mm (0.067–0.075 in) long, the middle lobe egg-shaped and the side lobes rounded. Flowering has been recorded in February and April.

== Taxonomy ==
This species was first formally described in 2006 by Gordon Guymer who gave it the name Commersonia leiperi in the journal Austrobaileya from specimens collected near Childers in 1996. In 2011, Carolyn Wilkins and Barbara Whitlock transferred the species to Androcalva as A. leiperi in Australian Systematic Botany. The specific epithet (leiperi) honours Glenn Leiper, who discovered the species and has cultivated it in Beenleigh.

== Distribution and habitat ==
Androcalva leiperi grows in woodland and open forest in a restricted area just south of Bundaberg and south-west of Maryborough in Queensland.

== Conservation status ==
Androcalva leiperi is listed as "endangered" under the Queensland Nature Conservation Act 1992. It is not currently listed under the Australian Government Environment Protection and Biodiversity Conservation Act 1999. The species has been nominated for assessment by the Threatened Species Scientific Committee. The assessment is expected to be completed by the end of October 2026 with the proposed listing of "endangered" under the Environment Protection and Biodiversity Conservation Act 1999.
