= Zieria bifida =

Conservation status
- Endangered (EPBC Act)

Scientific classification
- Kingdom: Plantae
- Clade: Tracheophytes
- Clade: Angiosperms
- Clade: Eudicots
- Clade: Rosids
- Order: Sapindales
- Family: Rutaceae
- Genus: Zieria
- Species: Z. bifida

Binomial name
- Zieria bifida Duretto & P.I.Forst.

Species of shrub

Zieria bifida is a plant in the citrus family Rutaceae and is only known from two areas near Nambour in Queensland. It is an open, straggly shrub with hairy branches, three-part leaves and small, white flowers in small groups, each flower with four petals and four stamens.

== Description ==
Zieria bifida is an open, straggly shrub which grows to a height of 2 m (7 ft) and has spindly branches covered with forked hairs. The leaves have three parts, resembling clover leaves and the leaflets are elliptic to egg-shaped, 7–20 mm (0.3–0.8 in) long and 3.5–8 mm (0.1–0.3 in) wide. The petiole is 3–7 mm (0.1–0.3 in) long. There are few forked hairs along the edges of the leaflets and on the midrib on the lower surface. Unlike some similar zierias, the leaf margins are thickened and flat.

The flowers are white or pinkish-cream and are arranged in leaf axils in groups of about seven on a stalk 4–15 mm (0.2–0.6 in) long. The groups are about the same length or shorter than the leaves and usually only one to three flowers are open at the same time. The four petals are elliptical in shape, about 2.5 mm (0.1 in) long and 1.5 mm (0.06 in) wide and the four stamens are about 1.5 mm (0.06 in) long. Flowering mainly occurs from December to April and is followed by fruit which is a glabrous capsule, 2–3 mm (0.08–0.1 in) long and about1 mm (0.04 in) wide.

== Taxonomy and naming ==
Zieria bifida was first formally described in 2007 by Marco Duretto and Paul Irwin Forster from a specimen collected in the Triunia National Park and the description was published in Austrobaileya. The species had previously been known as Zieria sp. "Brolga Park". The specific epithet (bifida) is a Latin word meaning "split into two parts", referring to the forked hairs on the branches and leaves.

== Distribution and habitat ==
This zieria grows in the transition zone between rainforest and open forest. It is only known from Triunia National Park (previously known as "Brolga Park") and a second nearby area on private property.

== Conservation ==
This zieria is listed as "endangered" under the Queensland Nature Conservation Act 1992 and under the Commonwealth Government Environment Protection and Biodiversity Conservation Act 1999 (EPBC) Act. The main threats to its survival are invasion by Lantana camara, and inappropriate fire regimes.
