= Ptilotus extenuatus =

Scientific classification
- Kingdom: Plantae
- Clade: Tracheophytes
- Clade: Angiosperms
- Clade: Eudicots
- Order: Caryophyllales
- Family: Amaranthaceae
- Genus: Ptilotus
- Species: P. extenuatus

Binomial name
- Ptilotus extenuatus Benl

Species of grass-like plant

Ptilotus extenuatus is a species of flowering plant in the family Amaranthaceae and is endemic to eastern Australia. It is an erect perennial plant with a woody rootstock, linear to egg-shaped or lance-shaped leaves, and spikes of about 20 crowded flowers. The species is extinct in New South Wales and "critically endangered" in Queensland.

== Description ==
Ptilotus extenuatus is an erect perennial plant with a woody rootstock with stems up to 30 cm (12 in) high that later lie close to the ground. The stems are covered with woolly hairs at first but later become glabrous. The leaves are linear to egg-shaped or lance-shaped, up to 12 mm (0.47 in) long, 3.5 mm (0.14 in) wide and petiolate, about 10–20 mm (0.39–0.79 in) apart. The flowers are borne in spikes up to 120 mm (4.7 in) long with up to 20 crowded flowers, each with three fertile stamens and a club-shaped ovary.

== Taxonomy ==
Ptilotus extenuatus was first formally described in 1981 by Gerhard Benl in the journal Telopea from specimens collected by Charles Fraser in 1818.

== Distribution ==
This species of Ptilotus is only known from four widely scattered collections, the type collection and one other in New South Wales, and two in the far south of Queensland.

== Conservation status ==
Ptilotus extenuatus is listed as "extinct" in New South Wales and "critically endangered" under the Queensland Government Nature Conservation Act 1992.

== See also ==
- List of Ptilotus species
