= Acacia rubricola =

Conservation status
- Endangered (NCA)

Scientific classification
- Kingdom: Plantae
- Clade: Tracheophytes
- Clade: Angiosperms
- Clade: Eudicots
- Clade: Rosids
- Order: Fabales
- Family: Fabaceae
- Subfamily: Caesalpinioideae
- Clade: Mimosoid clade
- Genus: Acacia
- Species: A. rubricola

Binomial name
- Acacia rubricola Pedley
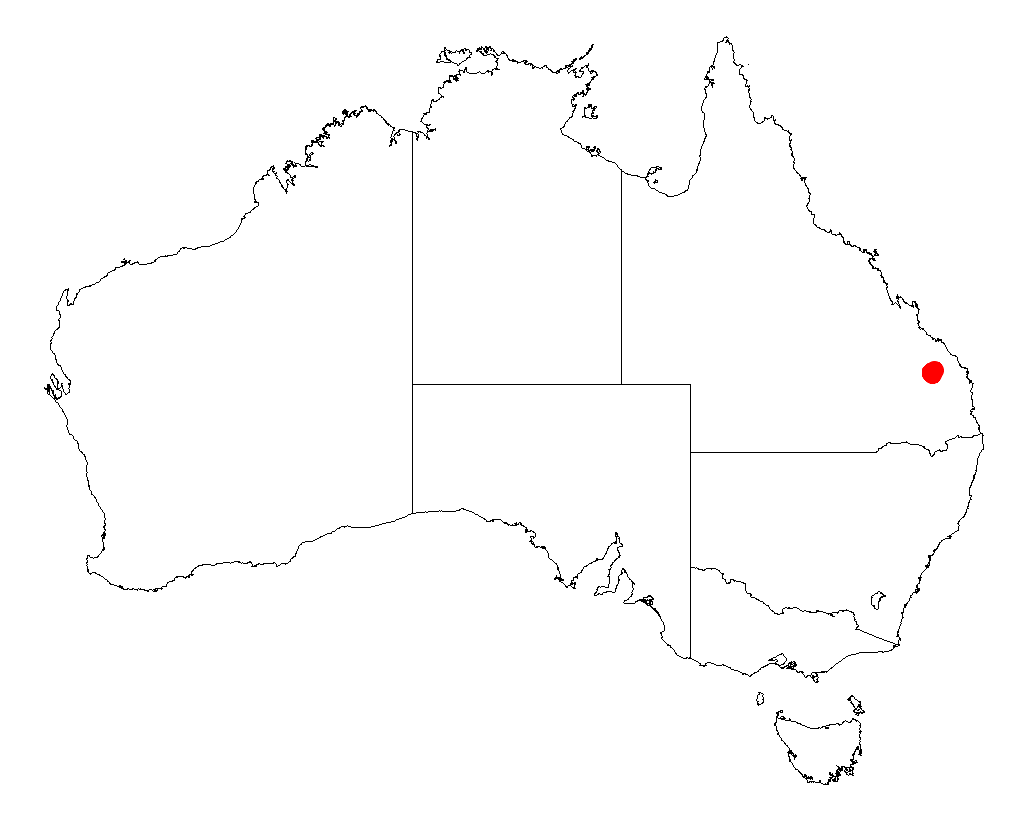
- Occurrence data from AVH

Species of legume

Acacia rubricola is a shrub belonging to the genus Acacia and the subgenus Phyllodineae native to north eastern Australia.

== Description ==
The shrub typically grows to a height of 2 metres (6.6 ft) and has many branches and heavy foliage and a bushy habit. It has ribbed hairy branchlets with the phyllodes emerging from the ribs. The flat, evergreen and linear shaped phyllodes have a length of 40 to 43 mm (1.6 to 1.7 in) and a width of 1 to 2 mm (0.039 to 0.079 in) and are generally straight or slightly sigmoid and have a single yellow translucent longitudinal nerve that is prominent on each side of the phyllode. It flowers between August and October producing simple inflorescences that have spherical flower-heads that contain 20 to 35 yellow flowers. After flowering, from late November to January, chartaceous dark brown seed pods will form that have a linear shape but are raised over the seeds,. The pods are found up to a length of around 40 mm (1.6 in) and a width of 2.5 mm (0.098 in) with longitudinally arranged seeds inside. The dark brown seeds have a length of 3.7 to 4.5 mm (0.15 to 0.18 in) and a width of 1.6 to 2 mm (0.063 to 0.079 in) with a cream coloured aril.

== Distribution ==
It is endemic to a small area on the Binjour Plateau in south eastern Queensland near Gayndah growing in red loamy soils as a part of heathland or open Eucalyptus woodland communities.

== Conservation status ==
Acacia rubricola is listed as "endangered" under the Queensland Nature Conservation Act 1992. It is not listed under the Australian Environment Protection and Biodiversity Conservation Act 1999.

== See also ==
- List of Acacia species
