= Acacia parvifoliolata =

Conservation status
- Endangered (NCA)

Scientific classification
- Kingdom: Plantae
- Clade: Embryophytes
- Clade: Tracheophytes
- Clade: Spermatophytes
- Clade: Angiosperms
- Clade: Eudicots
- Clade: Rosids
- Order: Fabales
- Family: Fabaceae
- Subfamily: Caesalpinioideae
- Clade: Mimosoid clade
- Genus: Acacia
- Species: A. parvifoliolata

Binomial name
- Acacia parvifoliolata Pedley

Species of flowering plant

Acacia parvifoliolata is a species of shrub of the genus Acacia endemic to a small area in and around the Belington Hut State Forest, near Taroom in Queensland.

== Description ==
It is a species of spindly shrub which can grow up to 4 metres high. The leaves are bipinnate, with there usually being 3-6 pairs of pinnae, which are spaced from 15-25 mms between one another. Flowers are yellow and appear spherical in shape. Pods are narrowly oblong, straight-edged or slightly constricted between seeds and obviously rounded over them, and are from 6.5 to 12 cms long as well as 6 to 8 mms in width. Seeds are longitudinal to slightly oblique or ellipsoid with dimensions of 6 x 5 mms; they are turgid and black.

== Habitat ==
It inhabits the open forest, sharing its habitat with other local woodland species including Eucalyptus chloroclada, Eucalyptus mediocris, Angophora leiocarpa and Allocasuarina inophloia. It grows on quartzitic sandstone. It is a common species within its limited range.

== Conservation ==
It has been assessed as Endangered under the Nature Conservation Act 1992.
