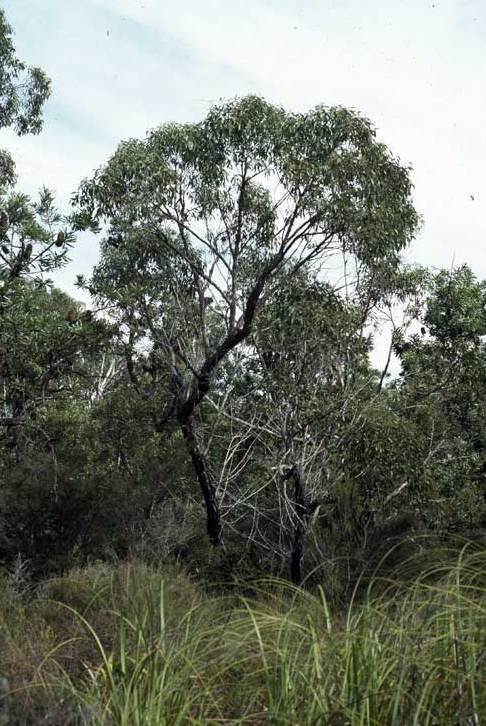

Conservation status
- Endangered (IUCN 3.1)

Scientific classification
- Kingdom: Plantae
- Clade: Tracheophytes
- Clade: Angiosperms
- Clade: Eudicots
- Clade: Rosids
- Order: Myrtales
- Family: Myrtaceae
- Genus: Eucalyptus
- Species: E. conglomerata

Binomial name
- Eucalyptus conglomerata Maiden & Blakely

= Eucalyptus conglomerata =

Swamp stringybark

Species of eucalyptus

Eucalyptus conglomerata, commonly known as the swamp stringybark, is a species of straggly tree or mallee that is endemic to Queensland. It has rough, fibrous "stringybark" lance-shaped to oblong adult leaves, flower buds in groups of eleven or more, white flowers and more or less barrel-shaped fruit.

== Description ==
Eucalyptus conglomerata is a straggly tree or a mallee, that typically grows to a height of 8–12 m (26–39 ft) and forms a lignotuber. It has greyish brown, fibrous stringybark over the trunk and most of the branches, sometimes smooth bark on the thinnest branches. Young plants and coppice regrowth have leaves that are glossy green on the upper surface, paler below, narrow elliptic to narrow lance-shaped, 18–42 mm (0.71–1.65 in) long, 4–15 mm (0.16–0.59 in) wide on a short petiole. Adult leaves are lance-shaped to elliptic, the same glossy green on both sides, 70–137 mm (2.8–5.4 in) long and 14–35 mm (0.55–1.38 in) wide on a petiole 7–18 mm (0.28–0.71 in) long.

The flower buds are arranged in groups of between eleven and fifteen or more on an unbranched peduncle 3–10 mm (0.12–0.39 in) long, the individual flowers sessile or on a pedicel up to 3 mm (0.12 in) long. Mature flower buds are oval to spindle-shaped, 4–5 mm (0.16–0.20 in) long and about 3 mm (0.12 in) wide with a conical operculum. Flowering occurs between April and August and the flowers are white. The fruit are woody truncated spherical or hemispherical capsules 2–5 mm (0.079–0.197 in) long and 4–7 mm (0.16–0.28 in) wide and clustered together.

== Taxonomy and naming ==
Eucalyptus conglomerata was first formally described in 1929 by Joseph Maiden and William Blakely and the description was published in Maiden's book A Critical Revision of the Genus Eucalyptus. The specific epithet (conglomerata) is a Latin word meaning "roll together", "crowd", "concentrated", referring to the clustered fruit of this species.

== Distribution and habitat ==
Swamp stringybark grows in damp, sandy soil, near creeks and swamps, often at the edges of heath. It occurs on the Sunshine Coast between Beerwah and Kin Kin.

== Conservation status ==
This eucalypt is classified as "endangered" under the Australian Government Environment Protection and Biodiversity Conservation Act 1999 and under the Queensland Government Nature Conservation Act 1992. The main threats to the species are land clearing, drainage works, urban development and road construction.

== See also ==
- List of Eucalyptus species
