= Acacia lumholtzii =

Conservation status
- Critically endangered (EPBC Act)

Scientific classification
- Kingdom: Plantae
- Clade: Tracheophytes
- Clade: Angiosperms
- Clade: Eudicots
- Clade: Rosids
- Order: Fabales
- Family: Fabaceae
- Subfamily: Caesalpinioideae
- Clade: Mimosoid clade
- Genus: Acacia
- Species: A. lumholtzii

Binomial name
- Acacia lumholtzii Leslie Pedley

Species of legume

Acacia lumholtzii, commonly known as Girringun wattle, is a species of flowering plant in the family Fabaceae and is endemic to a small region of north Queensland, Australia. It is a shrub with cream-coloured bark, hairy branchlets, linear phyllodes, spherical heads of flowers, and linear, thinly crusty, dark brown pods.

== Description ==
Acacia lumholtzii is a shrub that typically grows to a height of 2–4 m (6 ft 7 in – 13 ft 1 in) and has cream coloured bark covered with soft hairs pressed against the surface. Its new shoots are densely covered with soft hairs, the young tips red when fresh. The phyllodes are linear, straight to slightly curved, 80–110 mm (3.1–4.3 in) long and 1–4 mm (0.039–0.157 in) wide on raised stem projections. There are three to seven longitudinal veins, except when the phyllodes are very narrow, and a gland 2.5–8 mm (0.098–0.315 in) above the pulvinus. The flowers are arranged in spherical heads in short racemes on hairy peduncles 12–20 mm (0.47–0.79 in) long, the heads with 25 to 30 flowers. Flowering time is not known, but the pods are linear, dark brown, up to 130 mm (5.1 in) long, 4–5 mm (0.16–0.20 in)wide, thinly crusty and barely constricted between the seeds, but raised over them.

== Taxonomy ==
Acacia lumholtzii was first formally described by Leslie Pedley in the journal Austrobaileya from specimens collected on Bishop Peak, about 16 km (9.9 mi) south-south-east of Cardwell in 2001. The specific epithet (lumholtzii) commemorates Carl Lumholtz.

== Distribution and habitat ==
Girringun wattle is confined to Bishop Peak in Girringun National Park where it grows on granitic rock pavements and cliffs.

== Conservation status ==
Acacia lumholtzii is listed as 'Critically Endangered' under the Australian Government Environment Protection and Biodiversity Conservation Act 1999 and the Queensland Government Nature Conservation Act 1992.

== See also ==
- List of Acacia species
