= Zieria madida =

Thornton Peak stink bush

Conservation status
- Critically Endangered (NCA)

Scientific classification
- Kingdom: Plantae
- Clade: Tracheophytes
- Clade: Angiosperms
- Clade: Eudicots
- Clade: Rosids
- Order: Sapindales
- Family: Rutaceae
- Genus: Zieria
- Species: Z. madida

Binomial name
- Zieria madida Duretto & P.I.Forst.

Species of shrub

Zieria madida, commonly known as Thornton Peak stink bush, is a plant in the citrus family Rutaceae and endemic to tropical north-eastern Queensland. It is an open, compact shrub with three-part leaves (trifoliolate) and up to ten white to pale pink flowers with four petals and four stamens arranged in the leaf axils. It usually grows in exposed, windswept locations on granite mountaintops.

== Description ==
Zieria madida is an open, compact shrub which grows to a height of 2 m (7 ft) and has wiry branches with raised lumps where leaves have been shed. The leaves are composed of three elliptic to narrow egg-shaped leaflets. The leaves have a petiole 8–23 mm (0.3–0.9 in) long and the central leaflet is 15–29 mm (0.6–1 in) long and 5–14 mm (0.2–0.6 in) wide. Both sides of the leaflets are glabrous. The flowers are white to pale pink and are arranged in groups of between three and ten in leaf axils, although only three are open at the same time. The groups are on a stalk 4–13 mm (0.2–0.5 in) long and which has prominent ridges. The flowers are surrounded by scale-like bracts which remain during flowering. The sepals are triangular, about 1 mm (0.04 in) long and wide and the four petals are elliptic in shape, about 4 mm (0.2 in) long and 2 mm (0.08 in) wide with star-like hairs on both surfaces. The four stamens are 1.5–2 mm (0.06–0.08 in) long. Flowering occurs mainly from September to November and is followed by fruit which are more or less smooth, glabrous capsules 4 mm (0.2 in) long and about 2 mm (0.08 in) wide.

== Taxonomy and naming ==
Zieria madida was first formally described in 2007 by Marco Duretto and Paul Irwin Forster from a specimen collected on Thornton Peak and the description was published in Austrobaileya. The specific epithet (madida) is a Latin word meaning "moist", "soaked" or "sodden" referring to the wet, misty mountaintops where this species grows.

== Distribution and habitat ==
This zieria is found on and around Thornton Peak and Mount Pieter Botte where it grows on windswept granite outcrops on mountaintops.

== Conservation status ==
Zieria madida is classified as "critically endangered" under the Queensland Government Nature Conservation Act 1992. It is not listed in the Australian Government Environment Protection and Biodiversity Conservation Act 1999.
