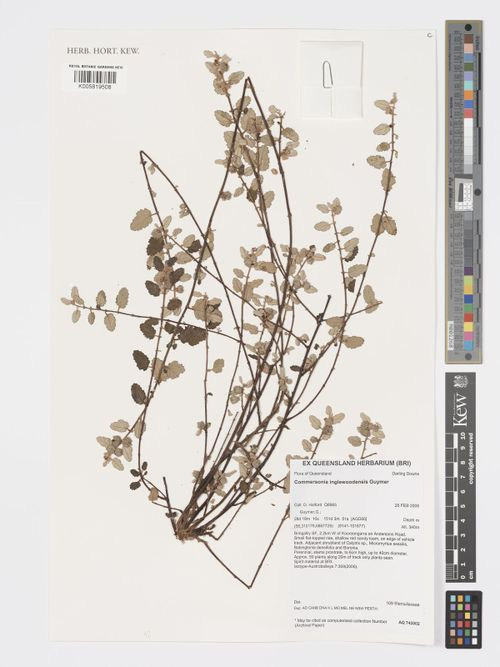
- Holotype in the Royal Botanic Gardens, Kew

Conservation status
- Critically endangered (EPBC Act)

Scientific classification
- Kingdom: Plantae
- Clade: Embryophytes
- Clade: Tracheophytes
- Clade: Spermatophytes
- Clade: Angiosperms
- Clade: Eudicots
- Clade: Rosids
- Order: Malvales
- Family: Malvaceae
- Genus: Androcalva
- Species: A. inglewoodensis

Binomial name
- Androcalva inglewoodensis (Guymer) C.F.Wilkins & Whitlock

Synonyms
- Commersonia inglewoodensis Guymer

= Androcalva inglewoodensis =

Species of shrub

Androcalva inglewoodensis is a species of flowering plant in the family Malvaceae and is endemic to south-eastern Queensland. It is a spreading, prostrate shrub that has hairy young branchlets, egg-shaped to elliptic leaves with irregularly serrated edges, and small groups of white to cream-coloured flowers.

== Description ==
Androcalva inglewoodensis is a spreading, prostrate shrub that typically grows to 6–10 cm (2.4–3.9 in) high and 40–90 cm (16–35 in) wide, its young branchlets covered with white, star-shaped hairs. The leaves are egg-shaped to elliptic, 2–25 mm (0.079–0.984 in) long and 2–20 mm (0.079–0.787 in) wide on a petiole 6–7 mm (0.24–0.28 in) long with minute stipules 1–2 mm (0.039–0.079 in) long at the base, but that fall off as the leaf matures. There are 6 to 10 pairs of irregular teeth 0.2–1 mm (0.0079–0.0394 in) long on the edges of the leaves, and the lower surface is densely covered with white, star-shaped hairs. The flowers are arranged singly or in groups of up to 3 on a peduncle less than 10 mm (0.39 in) long, each flower on a minute pedicel, with tiny bracts at the base. The flowers are white to cream-coloured and about 3 mm (0.12 in) in diameter with 5 petal-like sepals covered with star-shaped hairs. The petals are about 1.5 mm (0.059 in) long with 3 lobes, the central one oblong with 2 lobes at the tip. Flowering has been observed in February, March and November.

== Taxonomy ==
This species was first formally described in 2006 by Gordon Guymer who gave it the name Commersonia inglewoodensis in the journal Austrobaileya from specimens collected in Bringalily State Forest in 2006. In 2011, Carolyn Wilkins and Barbara Whitlock transferred the species to Androcalva as A. inglewoodensis in Australian Systematic Botany. The specific epithet (inglewoodensis) refers to the town of Inglewood, near where the species occurs.

== Distribution and habitat ==
Androcalva inglewoodensis is only known from about 50 plants near the type specimen location in Bringalily State Forest where it grows in shrubland, woodland and open forest in association with Calytrix, Kunzea, Melaleuca, and Callitris.

== Conservation status ==
Androcalva inglewoodensis is listed as "critically endangered" under the Queensland Government Nature Conservation Act 1992 (under the syn. Commersonia inglewoodensis), and "critically endangered" under the Environment Protection and Biodiversity Conservation Act 1999.
