= Zieria cephalophila =

Conservation status
- Critically Endangered (NCA)

Scientific classification
- Kingdom: Plantae
- Clade: Tracheophytes
- Clade: Angiosperms
- Clade: Eudicots
- Clade: Rosids
- Order: Sapindales
- Family: Rutaceae
- Genus: Zieria
- Species: Z. cephalophila

Binomial name
- Zieria cephalophila Duretto & P.I.Forst.

Species of shrub

Zieria cephalophila, commonly known as Sydney Heads stink bush, is a plant in the citrus family Rutaceae and is only found on a single, isolated mountain in Queensland. It is a compact shrub with wiry branches, warty, three-part leaves and one to three white flowers, each with four petals and four stamens, in leaf axils.

== Description ==
Zieria cephalophila is a compact shrub which grows to a height of 0.5 m (2 ft) and has warty, wiry branches with scattered hairs. The leaves have a petiole 2–3 mm (0.08–0.1 in) long with the central leaflet is 11–18 mm (0.4–0.7 in) long, 1.5–3.5 mm (0.06–0.1 in) wide with the other two leaflets slightly smaller. The leaflets have a distinct, warty mid-vein on the lower surface and the edges of the leaf are rolled under.

The flowers are white and are arranged singly or in groups of up to three in leaf axils on a stalk 1.5–6 mm (0.06–0.2 in) long, the groups shorter than the leaves. The four petals are narrow elliptical in shape, about 3.5 mm (0.1 in) long and densely hairy on both surfaces and the four stamens are up to 1.5 mm (0.06 in) long. Flowering appears to occur from November to May and is followed by fruit which is a glabrous capsule, about 2.5 mm (0.1 in) long and 1.5 mm (0.06 in) wide.

== Taxonomy and naming ==
Zieria cephalophila was first formally described in 2007 by Marco Duretto and Paul Forster from a specimen collected on a rocky mountain top known as Sydney Heads near Nebo in Queensland. The description was published in Austrobaileya. Duretto and Forster derived the specific epithet (cephalophila) "from the Greek cephalus (head) and philus (loving)", alluding to the populations of this plant occurring on Sydney Heads in the Homevale National Park, Queensland. In ancient Greek kephalē (κεφαλή) was used for "head". Cephalus is the Latinized version of Kephalos (Κέφαλος), first name of various Greek mythological and historical figures.

== Distribution and habitat ==
This zieria grows in woodland and shrubland on rocky, volcanic outcrops in the Homevale National Park.

== Conservation status ==
Zieria cephalophila is listed as "critically endangered" under the Queensland Nature Conservation Act 1992. It was changed from least concern to critically endangered in 2020 by the Queensland Government. It is not classified under the Australian Government Environment Protection and Biodiversity Conservation Act 1999
