= Solanum graniticum =

Conservation status
- Endangered (EPBC Act)

Scientific classification
- Kingdom: Plantae
- Clade: Tracheophytes
- Clade: Angiosperms
- Clade: Eudicots
- Clade: Asterids
- Order: Solanales
- Family: Solanaceae
- Genus: Solanum
- Species: S. graniticum

Binomial name
- Solanum graniticum A.R.Bean

Synonyms
- Solanum sp. (Gloucester Island G.N.Batianoff+ 9403312

Species of shrub

Solanum graniticum is a herbaceous resprouter which has a prosrate to sprawling habit. It is endemic to Queensland, Australia.

== Distribution & habitat ==
Solanum graniticum is a Queensland Endemic which is found occurring in Gloucester Island National Park and on the Australian mainland close by near Bowen. There is a disjunct population which occurs at Eungella Dam in Eungella, Queensland

== Conservation status ==
Solanum graniticum is listed as "Endangered" under the Queensland Nature Conservation Act 1992 and under the Australian Government Environment Protection and Biodiversity Conservation Act 1999.
