= Zieria alata =

Conservation status
- Critically Endangered (NCA)

Scientific classification
- Kingdom: Plantae
- Clade: Tracheophytes
- Clade: Angiosperms
- Clade: Eudicots
- Clade: Rosids
- Order: Sapindales
- Family: Rutaceae
- Genus: Zieria
- Species: Z. alata

Binomial name
- Zieria alata Duretto & P.I.Forst.

Species of flowering plant

Zieria alata is a plant in the citrus family Rutaceae and is only found on mountains in the Mossman and Daintree areas in Queensland. It is an open shrub with wiry, lumpy branches, three-part leaves and small, white, cream-coloured or pale pink flowers in small groups, each with four petals and four stamens.

== Description ==
Zieria alata is an open, sometimes straggly shrub which grows to a height of 3 m (10 ft) and has erect, wiry branches with raised, wing-like leaf bases blistered due to lumpy due to raised glands. The leaves have three parts, resembling clover leaves and the leaflets are elliptic to egg-shaped, 22–41 mm (0.9–2 in) long and 7–13 mm (0.3–0.5 in) wide. The leaflets have a distinct mid-vein on the lower surface and a few teeth on their sides near the tip. The leaf stalk is 12–18 mm (0.5–0.7 in) long.

The flowers are white or cream to pale pink and are arranged in leaf axils in groups of between three and nine on a stalk 8–16 mm (0.3–0.6 in) long. The groups are shorter than the leaves and usually only one to three flowers are open at the same time. The four petals are elliptical in shape, about 4 mm (0.2 in) long and 2 mm (0.08 in) wide and the four stamens are about 2 mm (0.08 in) long. Flowering mainly occurs from July to September and is followed by fruit which is a glabrous capsule, about 3 mm (0.1 in) long and 2 mm (0.08 in) wide.

== Taxonomy and naming ==
Zieria alata was first formally described in 2007 by Marco Duretto and Paul Irwin Forster from a specimen collected in the "North Mary Logging Area, State Forest 143" and the description was published in Austrobaileya. The specific epithet (alata) is a Latin word meaning "winged".

== Distribution and habitat ==
This zieria grows near granite boulders in windswept heath and stunted closed forest in areas higher than 1,000 m (3,000 ft) above sea leavel, on the ranges behind the Daintree River and Mossman.

== Conservation status ==
Zieria alata is listed as "critically endangered" under the Queensland Nature Conservation Act 1992. It was changed from least concern to critically endangered in 2020 by the Queensland Government. It is not classified under the Australian Government Environment Protection and Biodiversity Conservation Act 1999
