= Hat Head, New South Wales =

Hat Head New South Wales
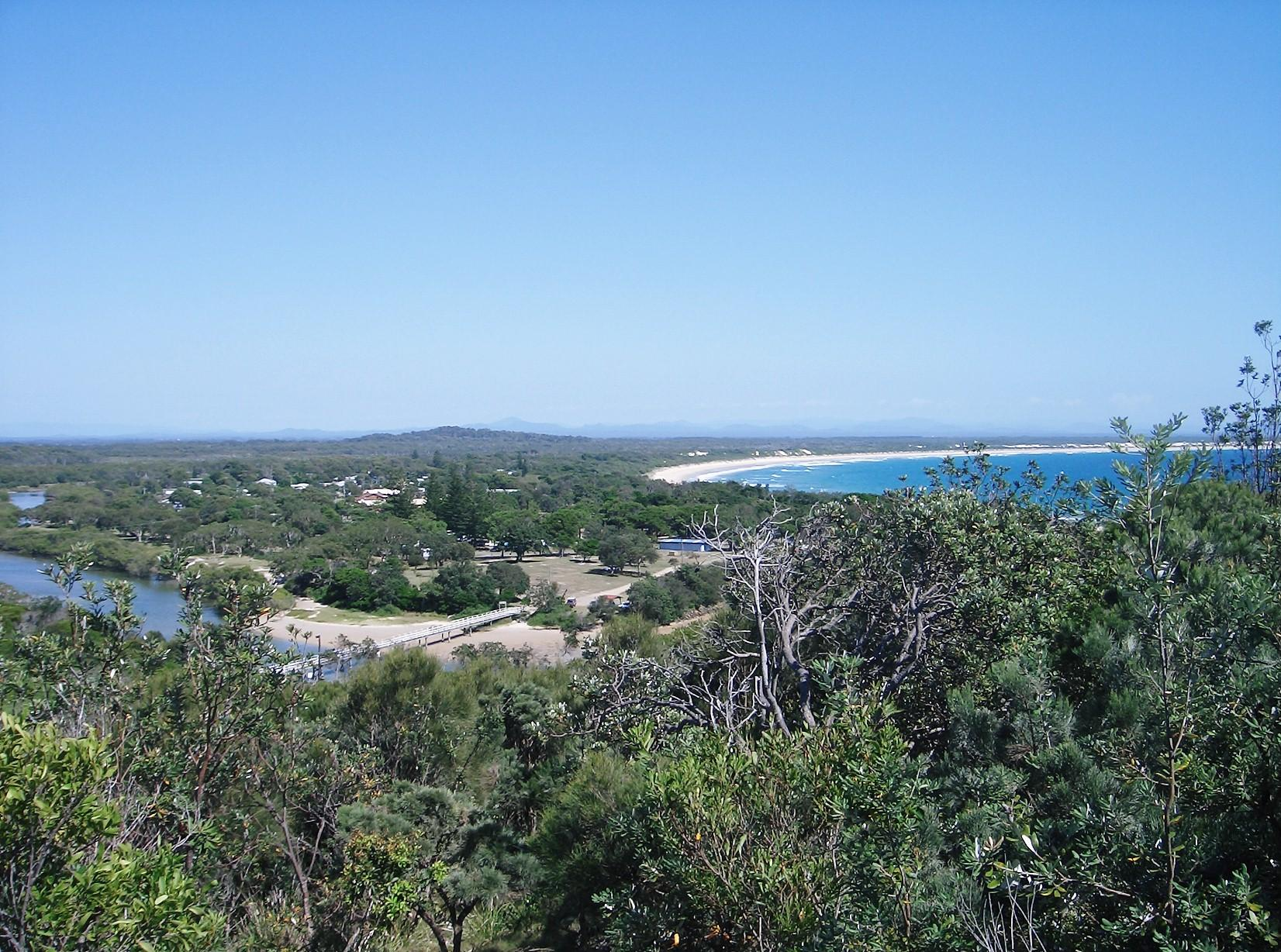
- View on Hat Head from Korogoro Point

- Coordinates: 31°03′16″S 153°03′00″E
- Population: 365 (SAL 2021)
- Postcode(s): 2440
- Location: 28 km (17 mi) NE of Kempsey; 43 km (27 mi) NE of Port Macquarie; 459 km (285 mi) N of Sydney
- LGA(s): Kempsey Shire
- State electorate(s): Oxley
- Federal division(s): Cowper

Hat Head is a coastal town on the Mid North Coast of New South Wales, 459 kilometres north of Sydney, and in the Hat Head National Park. At the time of the 2021 census, Hat Head had a population of 365 people.

Straight Street is the main street and is below sea level; however it has been many years since any flood activity invaded the village. A flood gate has effectively halted any freshwater flowing along Korogoro Creek from its source at the Swan Pool wetland, to its mouth at Hat Head. As a result, the creek suffers increasingly from sedimentation and will benefit from periodic opening of the installed floodgates during small flood events.

Part of the Kempsey Shire, Hat Head is a semi-isolated coastal location. It is predominantly a fishing village and tourist fishing resort. Approximately 350 permanent residents live on sand-based land mass surrounded by a national park and water — little, if any, land remains for new building — and property values are as much as fourfold higher compared to the balance of Kempsey Shire. It is a much sought-after location providing unique residential conditions.

Hat Head has good community facilities such as a library with internet access as part of the Nicholl Community Centre, a tiny church, tennis courts, covered children's playground, and disabled access to a beach viewing platform.

Due to a lack of road access, the area only started to be developed in the first part of the 20th century. Some early photographs show building and leisure activities.

Historical population
Year	Pop.	±%
1976	280	—
1981	330	+17.9%
1986	355	+7.6%
1991	349	−1.7%
1996	334	−4.3%
2001	319	−4.5%
2006	298	−6.6%
2011	326	+9.4%
2016	302	−7.4%
2021	365	+20.9%
Source: Australian Bureau of Statistics data.
