= Solanum johnsonianum =

Conservation status
- Endangered (EPBC Act)

Scientific classification
- Kingdom: Plantae
- Clade: Embryophytes
- Clade: Tracheophytes
- Clade: Spermatophytes
- Clade: Angiosperms
- Clade: Eudicots
- Clade: Asterids
- Order: Solanales
- Family: Solanaceae
- Genus: Solanum
- Species: S. johnsonianum

Binomial name
- Solanum johnsonianum A.R.Bean

Species of shrub

Solanum johnsonianum is an erect rhizomatous perennial shrub which is endemic to Queensland, Australia.

== Distribution & habitat ==
This species occurs from north-west Theodore to north Biloela in Acacia harpophylla vegetation on cracking clay soil.

== Phenology ==
Flowering has been observed in March to August with fruiting observed in April to May.

== Conservation status ==
Solanum dissectum is listed as "endangered" under the Queensland Nature Conservation Act 1992 and under the Australian Government Environment Protection and Biodiversity Conservation Act 1999.
