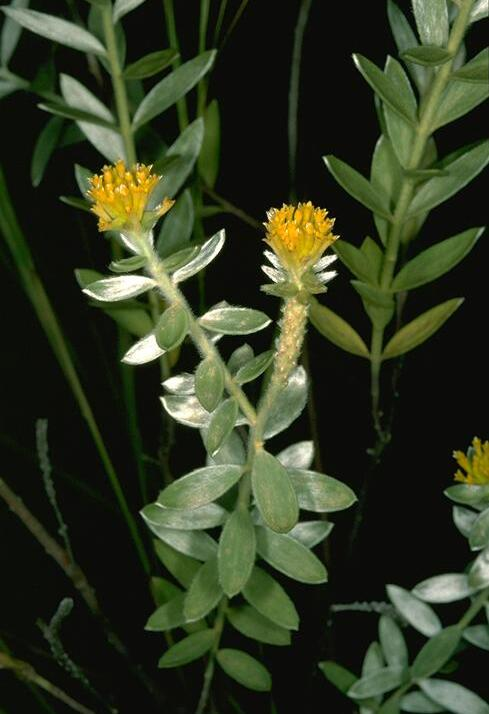
- Near the Tate River

Scientific classification
- Kingdom: Plantae
- Clade: Tracheophytes
- Clade: Angiosperms
- Clade: Eudicots
- Clade: Rosids
- Order: Malvales
- Family: Thymelaeaceae
- Genus: Pimelea
- Species: P. amabilis

Binomial name
- Pimelea amabilis (Domin) A.R.Bean

= Pimelea amabilis =

Species of shrub

Pimelea amabilis is a species of flowering plant in the family Thymelaeaceae and is endemic to northern Queensland. It is a small shrub with narrowly elliptic or elliptic leaves and spikes of hairy, yellowy-green or yellow, tube-shaped flowers.

== Description ==
Pimelea amabilis is a shrub that typically grows to a height of 0.5–1 m (1 ft 8 in – 3 ft 3 in) and has densely hairy young stems. The leaves are narrowly elliptic to elliptic, mostly 20–36 mm (0.79–1.42 in) long and 4–11 mm (0.16–0.43 in) wide, on a petiole 0.3–1 mm (0.012–0.039 in) long, both surface densely hairy. The flowers are borne in spikes of 75 to 250 on a densely hairy rachis 17–70 mm (0.67–2.76 in) long. The flowers are yellowy-green or yellow, the floral tube 4.5–6.2 mm (0.18–0.24 in) long, the sepals 0.6–1.3 mm (0.024–0.051 in) long and densely hairy on the outside. Flowering occurs from January to August.

== Taxonomy ==
This pimelea was first formally described in 1928 by Karel Domin in his Bibliotheca Botanica. The specific epithet (amabilis) means "lovable" or "pleasing".

== Distribution and habitat ==
Pimelea amabilis grows on rocky outcrops, mostly from the Hann Tableland to Mount Garnet and Mount Surprise in north Queensland.
