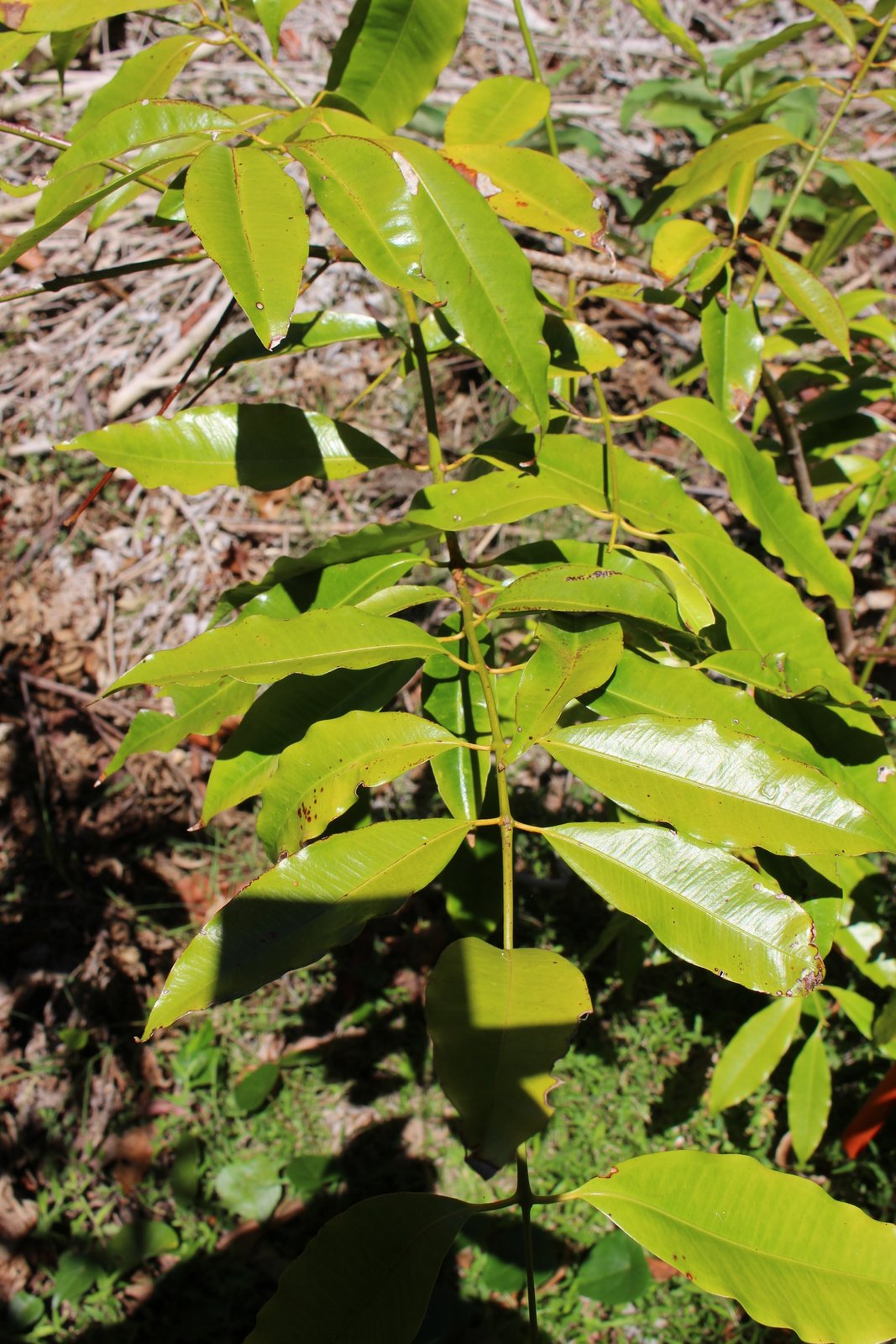

Scientific classification
- Kingdom: Plantae
- Clade: Tracheophytes
- Clade: Angiosperms
- Clade: Eudicots
- Clade: Rosids
- Order: Myrtales
- Family: Myrtaceae
- Genus: Syzygium
- Species: S. glenum

Binomial name
- Syzygium glenum Craven

= Syzygium glenum =

Species of tree

Syzygium glenum, known as a satinash, is a rainforest plant of tropical Queensland, Australia. Found in tropical Queensland in Australia. Usually a small tree, it may reach 10 metres tall.
