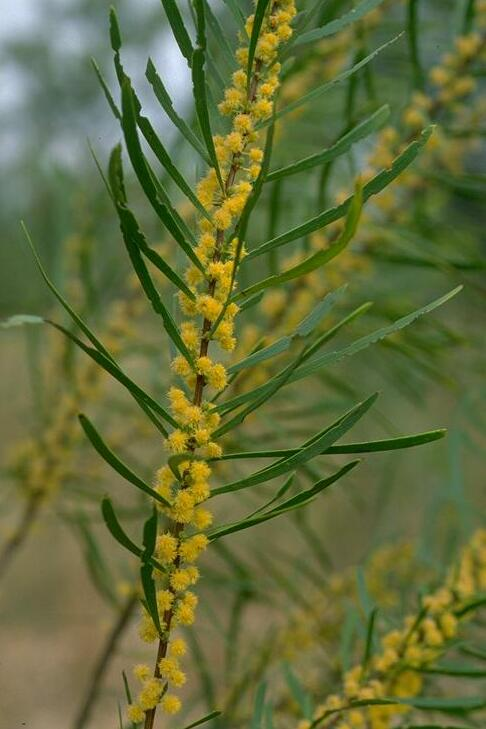
- In White Mountains National Park

Scientific classification
- Kingdom: Plantae
- Clade: Embryophytes
- Clade: Tracheophytes
- Clade: Spermatophytes
- Clade: Angiosperms
- Clade: Eudicots
- Clade: Rosids
- Order: Fabales
- Family: Fabaceae
- Subfamily: Caesalpinioideae
- Clade: Mimosoid clade
- Genus: Acacia
- Species: A. ramiflora

Binomial name
- Acacia ramiflora Domin
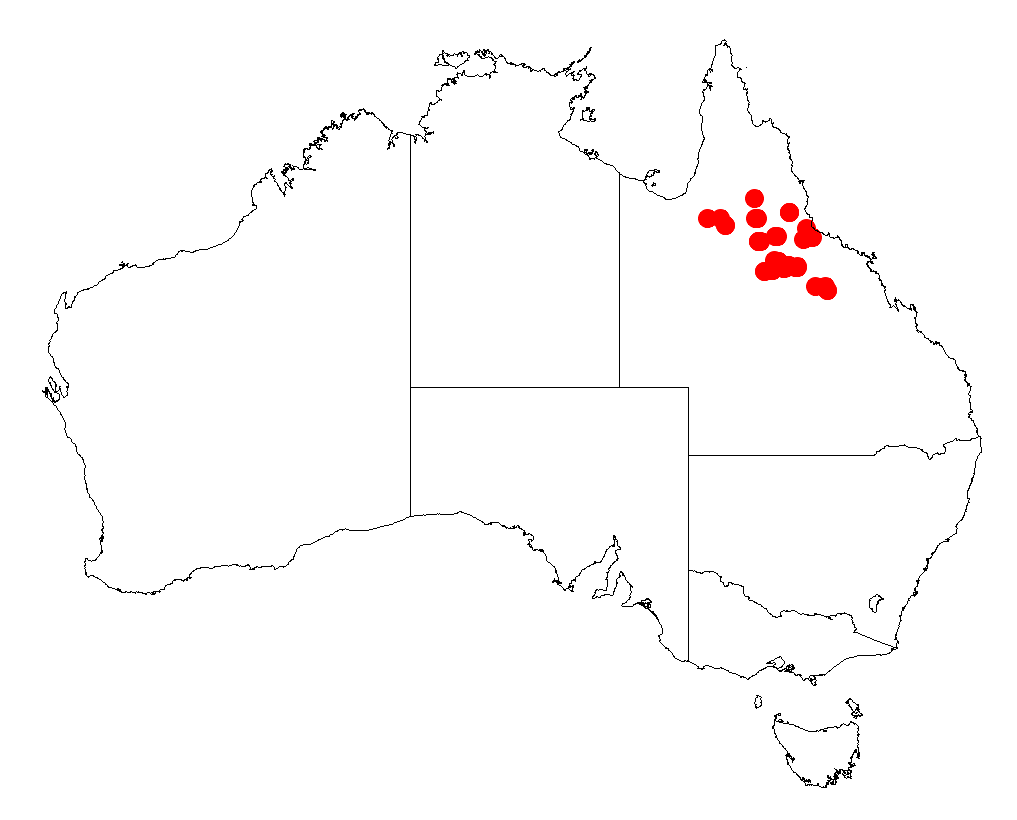
- Occurrence data from AVH

= Acacia ramiflora =

Species of legume

Acacia ramiflora is a shrub of the genus Acacia, and the subgenus Plurinerves endemic to an inland area of northeastern Australia.

The shrub typically grows to a maximum height of about 3 m (9.8 ft) and has a slender habit with pendulous, angled and glabrous branchlets.

== See also ==
- List of Acacia species
