= Acacia solenota =

Conservation status
- Vulnerable (EPBC Act)

Scientific classification
- Kingdom: Plantae
- Clade: Tracheophytes
- Clade: Angiosperms
- Clade: Eudicots
- Clade: Rosids
- Order: Fabales
- Family: Fabaceae
- Subfamily: Caesalpinioideae
- Clade: Mimosoid clade
- Genus: Acacia
- Species: A. solenota

Binomial name
- Acacia solenota Pedley
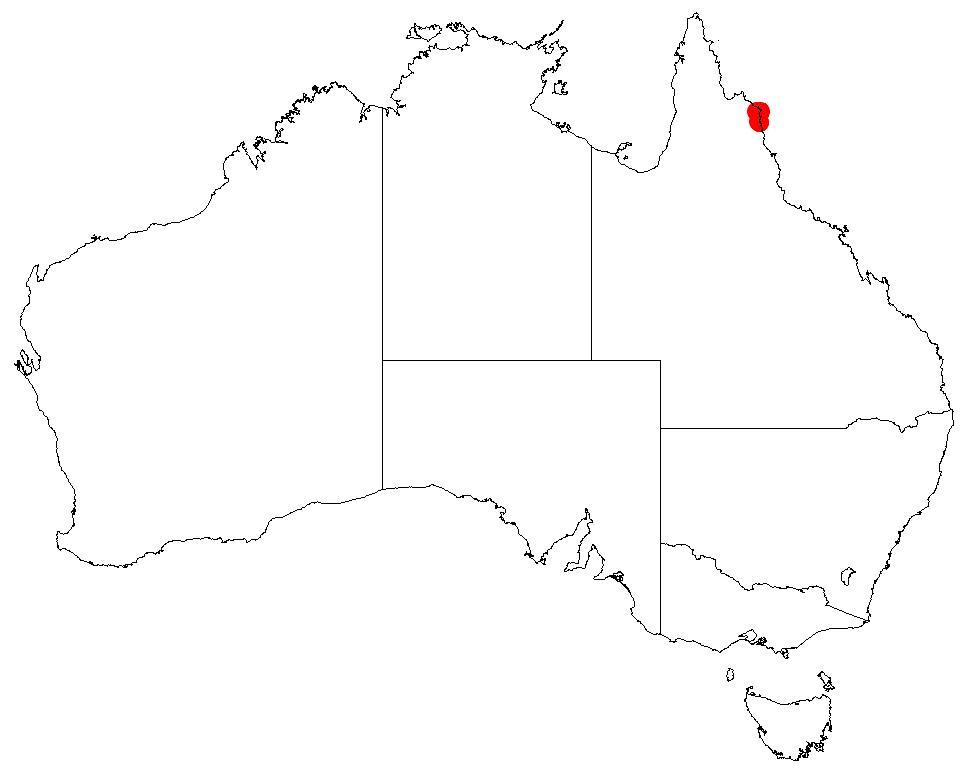
- Occurrence data from AVH

Species of legume

Acacia solenota is a shrub belonging to the genus Acacia and the subgenus Juliflorae that is endemic to north eastern Australia. The species was listed as vulnerable under the Environment Protection and Biodiversity Conservation Act 1999 in 2008.

== Description ==
The shrub that can grow to a height of around 5 metres (16 ft) and has a dense spreading habit. The glabrous branchlets have reddish brown coloured new growth that is sometimes scurfy. Like most species of Acacia it has phyllodes rather than true leaves. The glabrous, evergreen and dimidiate phyllodes have a length of 8 to 12.5 cm (3.1 to 4.9 in) and a width of 15 to 32 mm (0.59 to 1.26 in). The phyllodes are obtuse with a small callus mucro and have several fine, longitudinal nerves with two or three that are more prominent than the others. It blooms around February producing cylindrical flower-spikes that are almost white in colour with a length of 2.5 to 3.5 cm (0.98 to 1.38 in). Following flowering straight, thick and woody brown seed pods form that can have a length of up to 12 cm (4.7 in) and a width of 8 to 10 mm (0.31 to 0.39 in). The valves of the pods are widest near apex and then narrow toward the base and open elastically from the apex.

== Distribution ==
It is found along a narrow stretch of the north eastern coast of Queensland with a length of around 50 km (31 mi) from around Cooktown in the south to Cape Flattery in the north where it is situated among quaternary sand-dunes, often as dense stands as a part of scrub-land or heath-land communities where it is often associated with Corymbia intermedia.

== See also ==
- List of Acacia species
