= Allocasuarina emuina =

Conservation status
- Endangered (EPBC Act)

Scientific classification
- Kingdom: Plantae
- Clade: Embryophytes
- Clade: Tracheophytes
- Clade: Spermatophytes
- Clade: Angiosperms
- Clade: Eudicots
- Clade: Rosids
- Order: Fagales
- Family: Casuarinaceae
- Genus: Allocasuarina
- Species: A. emuina

Binomial name
- Allocasuarina emuina L.A.S.Johnson

Species of flowering plant

Allocasuarina emuina, commonly known as the Emu Mountain sheoak, is a shrub of the genus Allocasuarina native to Queensland, Australia.

The shrub has a spreading habit that typically grows to a height have 0.5 to 2.5 metres (1.6 to 8.2 ft) and has smooth bark. It has long wiry needle-like branchlets and their leaves are reduced to whorls of small triangular teeth which occur at regular intervals along the branchlets. The branchlets are up to 12 centimetres (5 in) long and go up the branch. The leaves are yellow-green in colour and usually have 6–8 teeth.

It has a limited distribution through a small area of South East Queensland across a linear range of 55 kilometres (34 mi) between Beerburrum and Noosa on the Sunshine Coast. There were four known population with an estimated total number of 12,000 individuals in 1993.

The species was first described by the botanist Lawrence Alexander Sidney Johnson in 1989 in the work Casuarinaceae. Flora of Australia.
