= Eucalyptus broviniensis =

Conservation status
- Near Threatened (IUCN 3.1)

Scientific classification
- Kingdom: Plantae
- Clade: Tracheophytes
- Clade: Angiosperms
- Clade: Eudicots
- Clade: Rosids
- Order: Myrtales
- Family: Myrtaceae
- Genus: Eucalyptus
- Species: E. broviniensis

Binomial name
- Eucalyptus broviniensis A.R.Bean

Species of eucalyptus

Eucalyptus broviniensis is a species of small tree that is endemic to a small area in Queensland. It has smooth bark, lance-shaped adult leaves, flower buds arranged in groups of seven, white flowers and conical fruit.

== Description ==
Eucalyptus broviniensis is a tree that typically grows to a height of about 10 metres (33 ft) and forms a lignotuber. It has smooth bark, pale orange when new but fades to grey. Young plants and coppice regrowth have egg-shaped leaves arranged alternately, 60–100 mm (2.4–3.9 in) long, 40–56 mm (2–2 in) wide and have a petiole. Adult leaves are lance-shaped, 100–150 mm (3.9–5.9 in) long, 25–45 mm (1–2 in) wide on a petiole 20–40 mm (0.79–1.6 in) long and are the same dull green colour on both sides. The flowers are borne in groups of seven in leaf axils on an unbranched peduncle 18–22 mm (0.71–0.87 in) long, the individual buds on a pedicel up to 2 mm (0.079 in) long. Mature buds are oval to spherical, 5–6 mm (0.20–0.24 in) long and about 5 mm (0.2 in) wide with a rounded operculum 3 mm (0.12 in) long. Flowering occurs in summer and the flowers are white. The fruit is a woody conical capsule 3–5 mm (0.12–0.20 in) long and 7–11 mm (0.3–0.4 in) wide with the valves extending above the rim.

== Taxonomy and naming ==
Eucalyptus broviniensis was first formally described in 2001 by Anthony Bean from a specimen collected near Brovinia and the description was published in the journal Austrobaileya. The specific epithet (boliviana) refers to the type location. The ending -ensis is a Latin suffix "denoting place", "locality" or "country".

== Distribution and habitat ==
This eucalypt grows in heath and woodland with a heathy understorey, on the edges of a plateau in the Brovinia State Forest.

== See also ==
- List of Eucalyptus species
