= Solanum dissectum =

Conservation status
- Endangered (NCA)

Scientific classification
- Kingdom: Plantae
- Clade: Tracheophytes
- Clade: Angiosperms
- Clade: Eudicots
- Clade: Asterids
- Order: Solanales
- Family: Solanaceae
- Genus: Solanum
- Species: S. dissectum

Binomial name
- Solanum dissectum Symon

Species of shrub

Solanum dissectum is an erect rhizomatous perennial herb which is endemic to Queensland, Australia.

== Distribution & habitat ==
This species occurs from Biloela, Banana, Baralaba in Acacia harpophylla and occasionally Eucalyptus thozetiana vegetation on cracking clay soil.

== Conservation status ==
Solanum dissectum is listed as "endangered" under the Queensland Nature Conservation Act 1992 and under the Australian Government Environment Protection and Biodiversity Conservation Act 1999.
