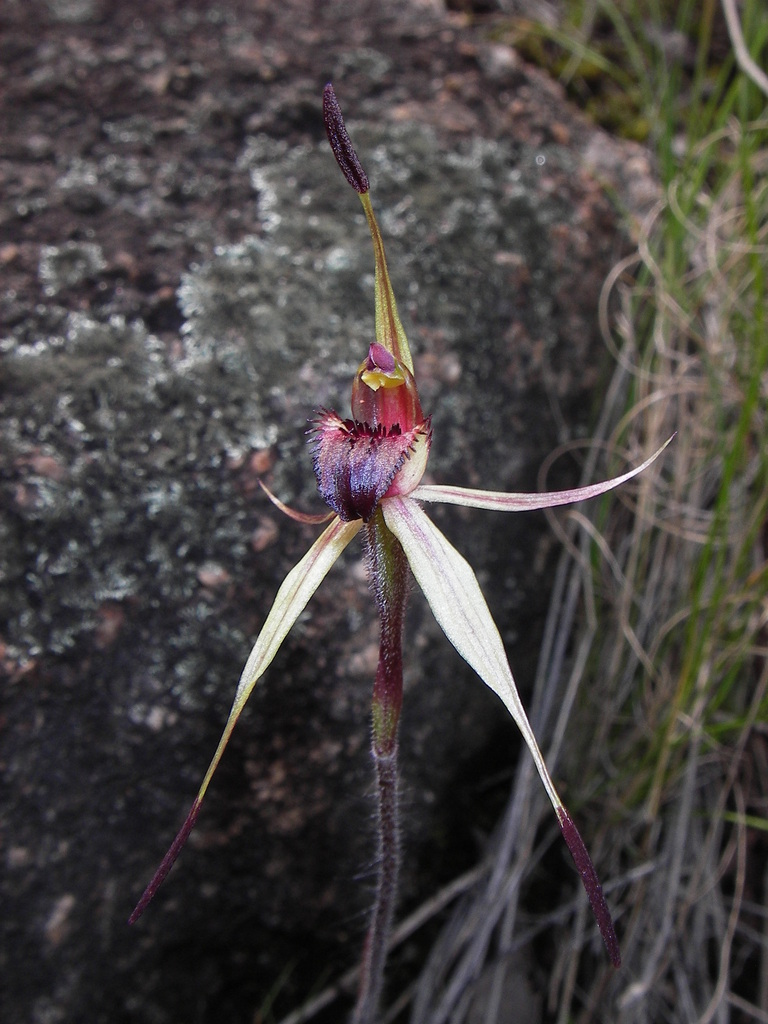

Conservation status
- Endangered (EPBC Act)

Scientific classification
- Kingdom: Plantae
- Clade: Tracheophytes
- Clade: Angiosperms
- Clade: Monocots
- Order: Asparagales
- Family: Orchidaceae
- Subfamily: Orchidoideae
- Tribe: Diurideae
- Genus: Caladenia
- Species: C. atroclavia

Binomial name
- Caladenia atroclavia D.L.Jones & M.A.Clem.

Synonyms
- Arachnorchis atroclavia (D.L.Jones & M.A.Clem.) D.L.Jones & M.A.Clem.

= Caladenia atroclavia =

Black-clubbed spider orchid

Species of orchid

Caladenia atroclavia, commonly known as the black-clubbed spider orchid, is a plant in the orchid family Orchidaceae and is endemic to south-eastern Queensland. It is a ground orchid with a single hairy leaf and a pale greenish-cream coloured flower with dark purple clubs and red patches on the petals.

== Description ==
Caladenia atroclavia is a terrestrial, perennial, deciduous, herb with an underground tuber and a single hairy leaf. The leaf is linear to lance-shaped, 8–12 cm (3–5 in) long, 5–10 mm (0.2–0.4 in) wide and has irregular red blotches near its base.

There is usually only one flower on a wiry, hairy spike 25–35 cm (9.8–14 in) high. The flower is pale greenish-cream with red blotches on the petals and is reported to smell like an overheated electric motor. The dorsal sepal is erect, 38–45 mm (1–2 in) long, about 1.5–2 mm (0.06–0.08 in) wide, linear to narrow lance-shaped near the base then narrowing to about 0.5 mm (0.02 in). The lower part of the dorsal sepal has a reddish stripe in its centre and ends with a thick, dark reddish-purple glandular tip. The lateral sepals are 39–45 mm (1.5–1.8 in) long, about 3 mm (0.1 in) wide, linear to lance-shaped and have a glandular end like the one on the dorsal sepal. The petals are 30–35 mm (1.2–1.4 in) long, about 1.5 mm (0.06 in) wide, linear to lance shaped with a red line along their centre. The petals and sepals spread widely near their bases but have drooping ends. The labellum is about 13–15 mm (0.5–0.6 in) long and 8–10 mm (0.3–0.4 in) wide and narrow egg-shaped when flattened. It is green and erect in the lower part, then dark maroon and curved nearer the end. There are 6 to 8 linear-shaped teeth along the edges, the longest about 1.5 mm (0.06 in) but decreasing in size towards the end. There are four rows of dark maroon calli in the centre of the labellum, the longest ones flat-topped and 2.2 mm (0.09 in) long. The column is 8–10 mm (0.3–0.4 in) long and curved with broad wings. Flowering occurs in October.

== Taxonomy and naming ==
Caladenia atroclavia was first formally described in 1998 by David Jones and Mark Clements and the description was published in Austrobaileya. The type specimen was collected near Wyberba in the Darling Downs district. The specific epithet (atroclavia) refers to the prominent dark-coloured ends of the sepals.

== Distribution and habitat ==
This caladenia grows in well-drained gravel derived from granite in woodland and swampy areas. Only four populations with a total of about 70 plants are known, occurring in the Girraween National Park and in the Wyberba area.

== Conservation ==
Caladenia atroclavia is classified as "Endangered" under the Queensland Government Nature Conservation Act and the Commonwealth Government Environment Protection and Biodiversity Conservation Act 1999 (EPBC) Act. The main threat to its survival is the feral pig Sus scrofa.

== Ecology ==
Research at the University of Southern Queensland has shown that the mycorrhizal fungus associated with this species of orchid belongs to the Sebacinaceae complex.
