= Zieria hydroscopica =

Scientific classification
- Kingdom: Plantae
- Clade: Tracheophytes
- Clade: Angiosperms
- Clade: Eudicots
- Clade: Rosids
- Order: Sapindales
- Family: Rutaceae
- Genus: Zieria
- Species: Z. hydroscopica

Binomial name
- Zieria hydroscopica Duretto & P.I.Forst.

Species of flowering plant

Zieria hydroscopica is a plant in the citrus family Rutaceae and is only known from a single state forest near Monto in Queensland. It is a small shrub with erect, wiry branches, three-part leaves and groups of large numbers of flowers, the groups smaller than the leaves and the flowers with four petals and four stamens. It is similar to Zieria smithii, differing only in the type of hairs on the branches and lower surface of the leaves.

== Description ==
Zieria hydroscopica is a shrub which grows to a height of 50 cm (20 in) and has erect, wiry branches with scattered, star-like hairs. The leaves are composed of three narrow elliptic to narrow lance-shaped leaflets with the narrower end towards the base. The leaves have a petiole 8–11 mm (0.3–0.4 in) long and the central leaflet is 20–33 mm (0.8–1 in) long and 4–6 mm (0.16–0.24 in) wide. Both sides of the leaflets are slightly hairy. The flowers are white and are arranged in groups of between eight and 25 or more in leaf axils, the groups on a stalk 2–8 mm (0.08–0.3 in) long. The sepals are triangular, about 1 mm (0.04 in) long and wide and the four petals are elliptic in shape, about 2 mm (0.08 in) long and 1.5 mm (0.06 in) wide, densely covered with star-shaped hairs on both sides. The four stamens are about 1 mm (0.04 in) long. Flowering occurs mainly in September and is followed by fruit which is a more or less glabrous capsule.

== Taxonomy and naming ==
Zieria hydroscopica was first formally described in 2007 by Marco Duretto and Paul Irwin Forster from a specimen collected in the Coominglah State Forest near Monto. The description was published in Austrobaileya. The specific epithet (hydroscopica) is said to be derived from the Greek hydro-, meaning "water" and scopic, meaning "watcher", referring to specimens of this species often growing near waterholes. The proper words in ancient Greek for "water" and "watcher" are hydōr (ὕδωρ) and skopos (σκοπός).

A doctoral thesis has proposed, on the basis of DNA analysis, that this species is a hybrid between Z. smithii and Z. cytisoides.

== Distribution and habitat ==
This zieria has been seen growing in open forest and near rocky creek beds in the Coominglah State Forest.
