= Solanum elachophyllum =

Conservation status
- Endangered (NCA)

Scientific classification
- Kingdom: Plantae
- Clade: Embryophytes
- Clade: Tracheophytes
- Clade: Spermatophytes
- Clade: Angiosperms
- Clade: Eudicots
- Clade: Asterids
- Order: Solanales
- Family: Solanaceae
- Genus: Solanum
- Species: S. elachophyllum

Binomial name
- Solanum elachophyllum F.Muell.

Species of shrub

Solanum elachophyllum is a prostrate sprawling to erect perennial shrub which is endemic to subcoastal coastal central Queensland, Australia.

== Distribution & habitat ==
This species only occurs in Central Queensland from Middlemount to Theodore in the west and to the east near Rockhampton. It occurs within Junee State Forest and Taunton National Park.

== Conservation status ==
Solanum elachophyllum is listed as "endangered" under the Queensland Nature Conservation Act 1992. It is not listed under the Australian Government Environment Protection and Biodiversity Conservation Act 1999.
