= Genoplesium tectum =

Cardwell midge orchid

Scientific classification
- Kingdom: Plantae
- Clade: Tracheophytes
- Clade: Angiosperms
- Clade: Monocots
- Order: Asparagales
- Family: Orchidaceae
- Subfamily: Orchidoideae
- Tribe: Diurideae
- Genus: Genoplesium
- Species: G. tectum

Binomial name
- Genoplesium tectum D.L.Jones

Synonyms
- Corunastylis tecta (D.L.Jones) D.L.Jones & M.A.Clem.

Species of orchid

Genoplesium tectum, commonly known as the Cardwell midge orchid, is a small terrestrial orchid endemic to a small area in north-eastern Queensland. It has a single thin leaf fused to the flowering stem and up to thirty light red flowers with a dark reddish-black, hairy labellum.

== Description ==
Genoplesium tectum is a terrestrial, perennial, deciduous, herb with an underground tuber and a single thin leaf with a reddish base and 150–300 mm (6–10 in) long, fused to the flowering stem with the free part 10–20 mm (0.4–0.8 in) long. Between five and thirty flowers are well spaced along a flowering stem 40–50 mm (1.6–2.0 in) long, reaching to a height 200–400 mm (8–20 in). The flowers lean downwards, are light red, about 5 mm (0.2 in) long and 4 mm (0.2 in) wide. As with others in the genus, the flowers are inverted so that the labellum is above the column rather than below it. The dorsal sepal is broadly egg-shaped, about 3 mm (0.1 in) long, 2 mm (0.08 in) wide and light reddish with prominent reddish-black bands. The lateral sepals are linear to lance-shaped, about 3.5 mm (0.1 in) long, 1 mm (0.04 in) wide, have a small gland on their tips and spread widely apart from each other. The petals are narrow egg-shaped, about 2.5 mm (0.1 in) long and 1 mm (0.04 in) wide with dark reddish bands. The labellum is elliptic to egg-shaped with the narrower end towards the base, about 5 mm (0.2 in) long, 2.5 mm (0.1 in) wide with its edges densely covered with short, purplish hairs. There is a dark reddish-black callus in the centre of the labellum and extending almost to its tip. Flowering occurs from November to March.

== Taxonomy and naming ==
Genoplesium tectum was first formally described in 1991 by David Jones and the description was published in Australian Orchid Research. In 2002, David Jones and Mark Clements changed the name to Corunastylis tecta but the change is not accepted by the Australian Plant Census. The specific epithet (tectum) is a Latin word meaning "covered", "concealed" or "secret", referring to the dense vegetation usually concealing this orchid.

== Distribution and habitat ==
The Cardwell midge orchid grows with dense sedges and grass in woodland and is only known from an area south of Cardwell.
