= Styphelia recurvisepala =

Scientific classification
- Kingdom: Plantae
- Clade: Tracheophytes
- Clade: Angiosperms
- Clade: Eudicots
- Clade: Asterids
- Order: Ericales
- Family: Ericaceae
- Genus: Styphelia
- Species: S. recurvisepala

Binomial name
- Styphelia recurvisepala (C.T.White) Sleumer
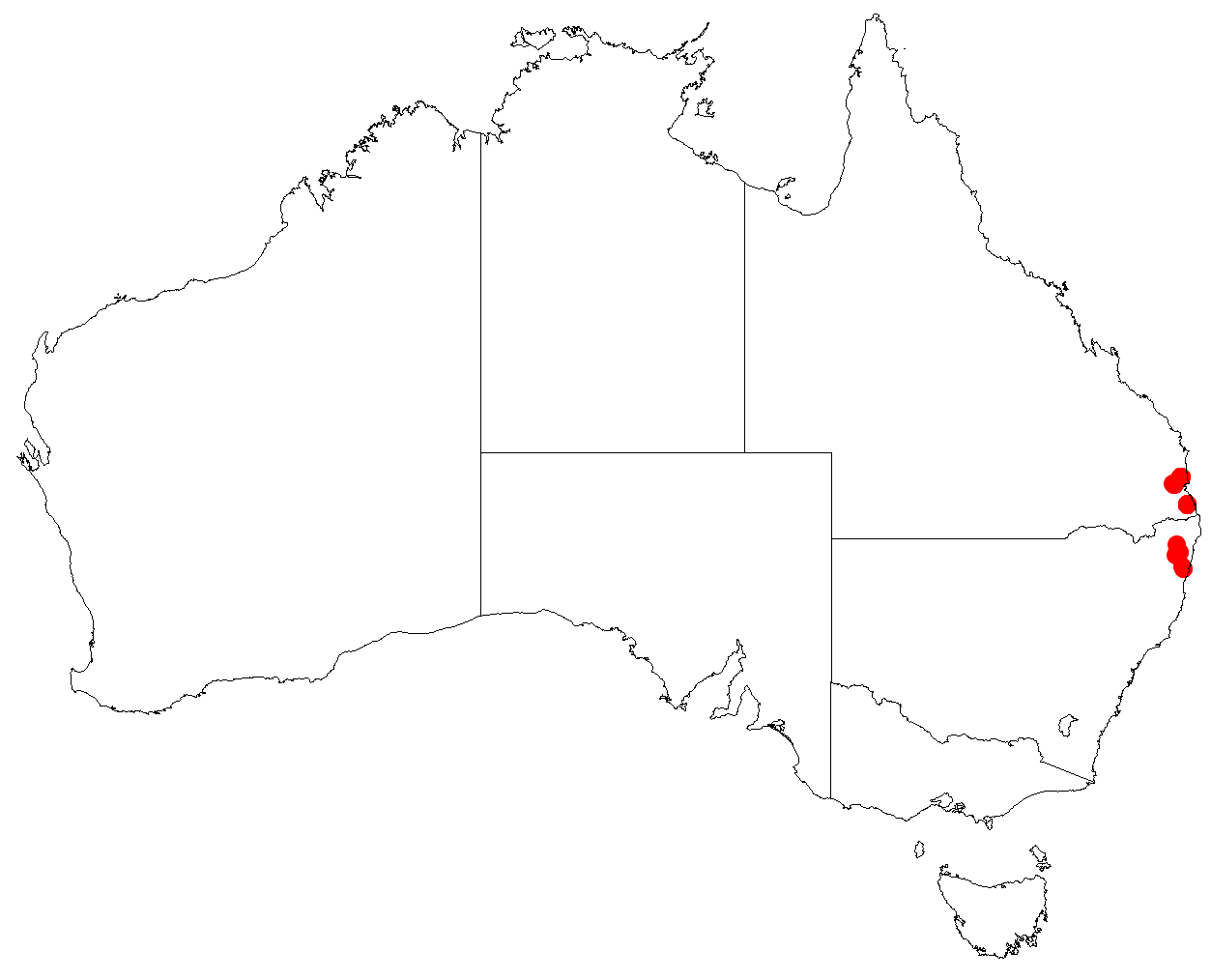
- Occurrence data from AVH

Synonyms
- Leucopogon recurvisepalus C.T.White

Species of plant

Styphelia recurvisepala is a species of flowering plant in the heath family Ericaceae and is endemic to eastern Australia. It is an erect to spreading shrub with linear leaves and erect, white, tube-shaped flowers usually arranged singly or in pairs in leaf axils.

== Description ==
Styphelia recurvisepala is an erect to spreading shrub that typically grows to a height of up to 1.3 m (4 ft 3 in), its branchlets covered with more or less woolly hairs. Its leaves are linear-oblong, 5.7–8.5 mm (0.22–0.33 in) long and 1.3–1.8 mm (0.051–0.071 in) wide on a petiole 0.3–0.4 mm (0.012–0.016 in) long. The edges of the leaves are rolled down and there are tiny teeth on the edges. The flowers are borne singly or in pairs in leaf axils on a peduncle about 1 mm (0.039 in) long with bracteoles 1.2–1.8 mm (0.047–0.071 in) long. The sepals are 2.0–3.0 mm (0.079–0.118 in) long and curved backwards, the petals white and joined at the base, forming a tube 1.4–2.1 mm (0.055–0.083 in) long, the lobes 1.7–3.2 mm (0.067–0.126 in) long and bearded.

== Taxonomy ==
This species was first formally described in 1944 by C.T. White who gave it the name Leucopogon recurvisepalus in the Proceedings of the Royal Society of Queensland from specimens collected by Charles Edward Hubbard near Plunkett in 1930. In 1963, Hermann Otto Sleumer transferred the species to Styphelia as S. recurvisepala in the journal Blumea.

== Distribution ==
Styphelia recurvisepala grows in forest and heath in sandy soil from south-eastern Queensland to the Grafton area in New South Wales.
