= Solanum adenophorum =

Conservation status
- Endangered (NCA)

Scientific classification
- Kingdom: Plantae
- Clade: Tracheophytes
- Clade: Angiosperms
- Clade: Eudicots
- Clade: Asterids
- Order: Solanales
- Family: Solanaceae
- Genus: Solanum
- Species: S. adenophorum

Binomial name
- Solanum adenophorum F.Muell.

Synonyms
- Solanum eremophilum (VIC)

Species of shrub

Solanum adenophorum is a herb shrub which is endemic to subcoastal coastal Central Eastern Queensland, Australia.

== Distribution & habitat ==
This species only occurs in Central Eastern Queensland from Dingo, Nebo, and Clermont areas. It occurs predominantly in Acacia harpophylla (brigalow) woodland on slightly inclined hillslopes, and in Acacia cambagei vegetation on deep cracking clay soil..

== Conservation status ==
Solanum adenophorum is listed as "endangered" under the Queensland Nature Conservation Act 1992. It is not listed under the Australian Government Environment Protection and Biodiversity Conservation Act 1999.
