= Nature Conservation Act 1992 =

Environmental legislation of Queensland, Australia

Parliament of Queensland

The Nature Conservation Act 1992 is an act of the Parliament of Queensland, Australia, that, together with subordinate legislation, provides for the legislative protection of Queensland's threatened biota.

As originally published, it provided for biota to be declared presumed extinct, endangered, vulnerable, rare or common. In 2004, the act was amended to more closely align with the IUCN Red List categories: presumed extinct was changed to extinct in the wild and common was changed to least concern. Near threatened was introduced as an eventual replacement for rare, but the latter was to be phased out over time rather than immediately abandoned.

The act is administered by the state's Environmental Protection Agency (EPA). There are provisions under the act which allow landholders to negotiate voluntary conservation agreements with the EPA.

New regulations came into effect on 22 August 2020:

- the Nature Conservation (Animals) Regulation 2020 (the Animals Regulation), introducing a new animal licensing framework; and
- the Nature Conservation (Plants) Regulation 2020 (the Plants Regulation), which transferred all existing plant provisions into a single stand-alone regulation.

== See also ==
- Environment Protection and Biodiversity Conservation Act 1999, federal law
- List of environmental laws by country
- List of Nature Conservation Act endangered fauna of Queensland
- List of Nature Conservation Act endangered flora of Queensland
- List of Nature Conservation Act extinct in the wild flora of Queensland
- List of Nature Conservation Act rare flora of Queensland
- List of Nature Conservation Act vulnerable flora of Queensland
- Protected areas of Queensland
