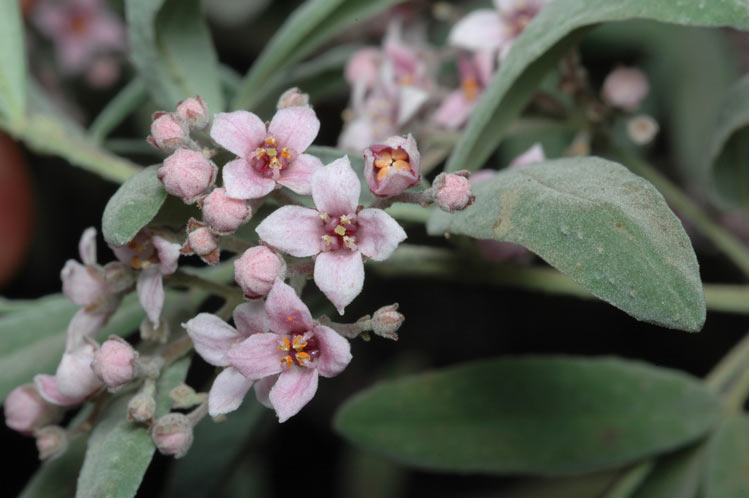

Conservation status
- Endangered (EPBC Act)

Scientific classification
- Kingdom: Plantae
- Clade: Tracheophytes
- Clade: Angiosperms
- Clade: Eudicots
- Clade: Rosids
- Order: Sapindales
- Family: Rutaceae
- Genus: Zieria
- Species: Z. formosa

Binomial name
- Zieria formosa J.D.Briggs & J.A.Armstr.

= Zieria formosa =

Shapely zieria

Species of flowering plant

Zieria formosa, commonly known as the shapely zieria, is a plant in the citrus family Rutaceae and is endemic to a small area on the south coast of New South Wales. It is a dense, rounded shrub with velvety, clover-like leaves composed of three leaflets. In spring there are clusters of small, pale pink flowers with four petals near the ends of the branches. It is similar to the Box Range zieria (Zieria buxijugum) which has a similar distribution, but has wider leaflets and an appendage on its anthers.

== Description ==
Zieria formosa is a dense, rounded shrub which grows about 1.5 m (5 ft) high and 1 m (3 ft) wide. Its younger branches are warty and covered with branched hairs. The leaves are arranged in opposite pairs and are composed of three leaflets with the central leaflet 15–30 mm (0.6–1 in) long and 3–5 mm (0.1–0.2 in) wide with a stalk 2–4 mm (0.08–0.2 in) long. The leaves appear silvery due to a dense covering of velvety hairs. Clusters of between 25 and 45 pale pink flowers 6–9 mm (0.2–0.4 in) in diameter are arranged in leaf axils, the clusters slightly shorter than the leaves. Each flower has four triangular sepals about 2 mm (0.08 in) long and four petals about 4 mm (0.2 in) long which are hairy only on their lower surface. The four stamens are tipped with orange-red anthers which have a small appendage. Flowering occurs from September to October and is followed by fruit which is a warty, four-chambered capsule about 5 mm (0.2 in) wide.

== Taxonomy and naming ==
Zieria formosa was first formally described in 2002 by John Briggs and James Andrew Armstrong from a specimen collected west of Pambula and the description was published in Australian Systematic Botany. The specific epithet (formosa) is a Latin word meaning "beautifully formed" or "handsome".

== Distribution and habitat ==
Shapely zieria is only known from a single population of about 40 adult plants and a larger number of small plants in an area of about 1 ha (2 acres) of heath on rhyolite rock across three private properties.

== Conservation ==
This zieria is listed as "critically endangered" under the New South Wales Threatened Species Conservation Act and as "endangered" under the Commonwealth Government Environment Protection and Biodiversity Conservation Act 1999 (EPBC) Act. The main threats to the species are changes to agricultural practices and trampling by livestock.
