= Zieria laxiflora =

Wallum zieria

Scientific classification
- Kingdom: Plantae
- Clade: Tracheophytes
- Clade: Angiosperms
- Clade: Eudicots
- Clade: Rosids
- Order: Sapindales
- Family: Rutaceae
- Genus: Zieria
- Species: Z. laxiflora

Binomial name
- Zieria laxiflora (Benth.) Domin

Species of shrub

Zieria laxiflora, commonly known as wallum zieria, is a plant in the citrus family Rutaceae and is endemic to eastern Australia. It is an erect shrub with leaves composed of three leaflets, and clusters of about nine white or pale pink flowers with four petals and four stamens. It usually grows is coastal heathland.

== Description ==
Zieria laxiflora is an erect shrub which grows to a height of about 1.2 m (4 ft). The branches are glabrous and have longitudinal ridges. Its leaves are composed of three leaflets with a petiole 5–10 mm (0.2–0.4 in) long and the central leaflet is 15–55 mm (0.6–2 in) long and 1–5 mm (0.04–0.2 in) wide. The upper surface of the leaves is more or less glabrous and dotted with oil glands whilst the lower surface is covered with small, star-like hairs. The flowers are white to pale pink and are arranged in groups of about nine in leaf axils but there can be as many as fifty in a group. The groups are usually about as long as the leaves but are sometimes much longer. The four sepal lobes are triangular, glabrous and about 2 mm (0.08 in) long. The four petals are about 3.5 mm (0.1 in) long and covered with short, soft hairs. In common with other zierias there are only four stamens. Flowering occurs from August to December and is followed from November by fruit which is a glabrous, slightly warty follicle.

== Taxonomy and naming ==
This zieria was first described in 1863 by George Bentham who gave it the name Zieria laevigata var. laxiflora and published the description in Flora Australiensis from a specimen collected on Stradbroke Island. In 1913, Karel Domin raised the variety to species status. The specific epithet (laxiflora) is derived from the Latin words laxus meaning "loose", "slack" or "unstrung" and flora meaning "flowers".

== Distribution and habitat ==
Wallum zieria is found in coastal areas north from Newcastle in New South Wales and as far north as Shoalwater Bay in Queensland. It grows in coastal wallum heath and sandy swamps.
