= Zieria robertsiorum =

Scientific classification
- Kingdom: Plantae
- Clade: Tracheophytes
- Clade: Angiosperms
- Clade: Eudicots
- Clade: Rosids
- Order: Sapindales
- Family: Rutaceae
- Genus: Zieria
- Species: Z. robertsiorum

Binomial name
- Zieria robertsiorum J.A.Armstr.

Species of shrub

Zieria robertsiorum is a plant in the citrus family Rutaceae and is endemic to the wet tropics of far north-eastern Queensland. It is a shrub with leaves composed of three leaflets, and flowers with four white petals. The flowers are arranged in groups of up to ten which are no longer than the leaves.

== Description ==
Zieria robertsiorum is an open, compact shrub which grows to a height of 2 m (7 ft) and which has branches which are hairy when young. Its leaves are composed of three narrow elliptic to egg-shaped leaflets with the middle leaflet 6–23 mm (0.2–0.9 in) long and 2–11 mm (0.08–0.4 in) wide with a petiole 2–10 mm (0.08–0.4 in) long. The leaves are more or less flat and are covered with glandular hairs. The flowers are arranged in groups of mostly 3 to 10 in leaf axils but only up to three are open at the same time. The groups are no longer than the leaves. Each flower is surrounded by scaly to leaf-like bracts up to 3 mm (0.1 in) long and the four sepal lobes are about 1 mm (0.04 in) long and wide. The four petals are white, 1.5–3.5 mm (0.06–0.1 in) long and 1–2 mm (0.04–0.08 in) wide. In common with other zierias, there are only four stamens. Flowering occurs from May to December and is followed by fruit which is a glabrous follicle 3 mm (0.1 in) long and 2 mm (0.08 in) wide.

== Taxonomy and naming ==
Zieria robertsiorum was first formally described in 1996 by James Andrew Armstrong and the description was published in Australian Systematic Botany from a specimen collected on Mount Finnegan.

== Distribution and habitat ==
This zieria grows in rock crevices and between granite boulders in windswept woodland in the wet tropic of far northern Queensland.
