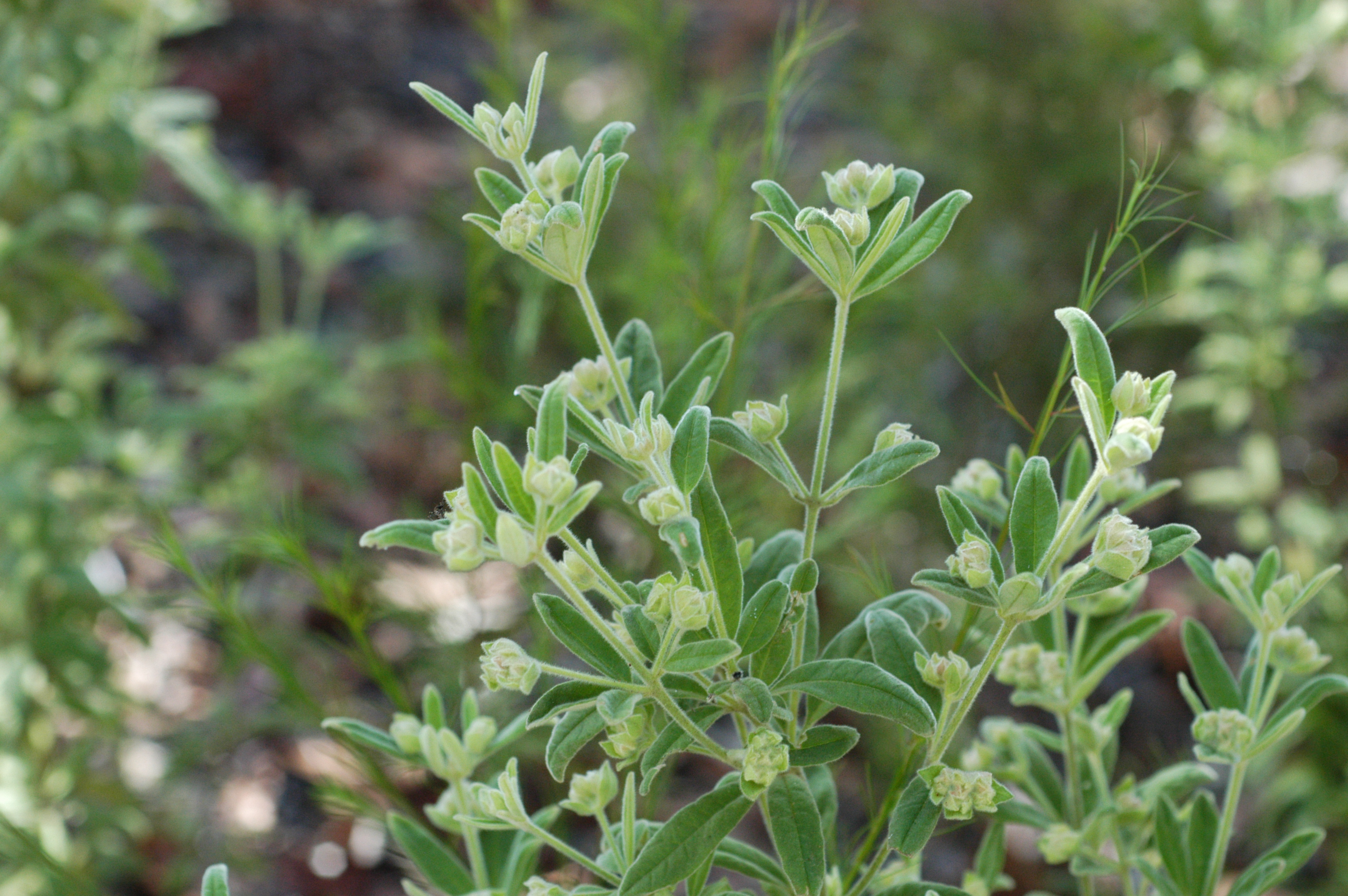
- In Yengo National Park

Conservation status
- Vulnerable (EPBC Act)

Scientific classification
- Kingdom: Plantae
- Clade: Tracheophytes
- Clade: Angiosperms
- Clade: Eudicots
- Clade: Rosids
- Order: Sapindales
- Family: Rutaceae
- Genus: Zieria
- Species: Z. involucrata

Binomial name
- Zieria involucrata R.Br. ex Benth.

Synonyms
- Zieria cytisoides var. involucrata (R.Br. ex Benth.) C.Moore

= Zieria involucrata =

Species of shrub

Zieria involucrata is a plant in the citrus family Rutaceae and is endemic to New South Wales. It is a sparse, erect shrub with mostly three-part leaves and groups of up to 21 small white flowers, the groups shorter than the leaves. It mostly occurs in the lower Blue Mountains, but is also known from other areas around Sydney.

== Description ==
Zieria involucrata is a sparse, erect shrub that grows to a height of 1–2 m (3–7 ft) with its branches and leaves densely covered with soft, velvety leaves. The leaves have a petiole 3–10 mm (0.1–0.4 in) long and are mostly composed of three elliptic to lance-shaped leaflets 30–55 mm (1–2 in) long and 6–15 mm (0.2–0.6 in) wide, although some leaves may have only one leaflet. The leaflets are more or less flat, dark green on the upper surface and light greyish-green below. The flowers are white, sometimes with a pink tinge and arranged in groups of between three and 21, the groups mostly shorter than the leaves. Hairy, leaf-like bracts surround the flowers and usually remain on the plant during flowering and are 7–12 mm (0.3–0.5 in) long. The sepals are triangular, 3–4.5 mm (0.1–0.2 in) long and the four petals are about 3–5 mm (0.1–0.2 in) long and slightly hairy. There are four stamens. Flowering occurs from August to October and is followed by fruits that are hairy follicles.

== Taxonomy and naming ==
Zieria involucrata was first formally described in 1863 by George Bentham from an unpublished description by Robert Brown. Bentham's description was published in Flora Australiensis. The specific epithet (involucrata) is derived from the Latin word involucrum meaning "wrapper", "case" or "envelope", referring to the persistent bracts.

== Distribution and habitat ==
This zieria grows in wet forest, mainly in the lower Blue Mountains but has also been recorded from north and west of Sydney.

== Conservation ==
Zieria involucrata is classified as "vulnerable" under the Australian Government Environment Protection and Biodiversity Conservation Act 1999 and as "endangered" under the New South Wales Government Threatened Species Conservation Act 1995. The main threat to the species is inappropriate fire regimes, especially frequent fires.
