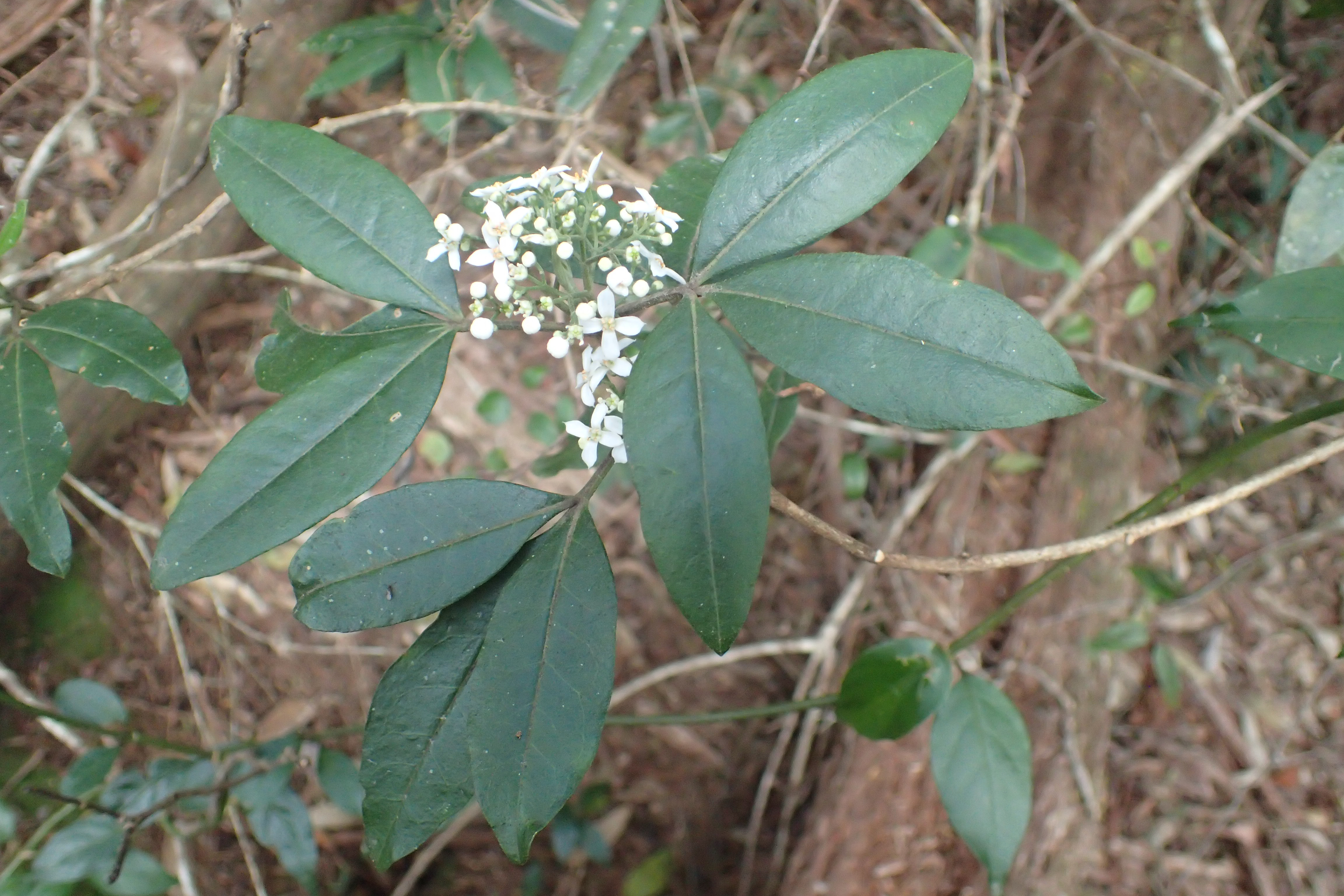
- In Dorrigo National Park

Scientific classification
- Kingdom: Plantae
- Clade: Tracheophytes
- Clade: Angiosperms
- Clade: Eudicots
- Clade: Rosids
- Order: Sapindales
- Family: Rutaceae
- Genus: Zieria
- Species: Z. southwellii

Binomial name
- Zieria southwellii J.A.Armstr.

= Zieria southwellii =

Species of shrub

Zieria southwellii is a plant in the citrus family Rutaceae and is endemic to eastern Australia. It is a large shrub or small tree with its leaves composed of three leaflets, and has groups of large numbers of flowers with four white petals, the groups shorter than the leaves. It grows near rainforest in northern New South Wales and far south-eastern Queensland.

== Description ==
Zieria southwellii is a tall shrub or small tree which grows to a height of 5 m (20 ft). Its leaves are composed of three leaflets with the middle leaflet elliptic in shape, 45–90 mm (2–4 in) long, and 15–27 mm (0.6–1 in) wide with a rounded tip. The petiole is 18–35 mm (0.7–1 in) long and the upper surface of the leaf is more or less glabrous and the lower surface has oil glands. The flowers are arranged in large numbers in upper leaf axils, the groups usually shorter than the leaves. There are four triangular sepal lobes about 0.6 mm (0.02 in) long and four petals which are 4–5 mm (0.16–0.20 in) long, white and hairy. In common with other zierias, there are only four stamens. Flowering occurs from August to December and is followed by fruits which are mostly glabrous capsules dotted with oil glands.

== Taxonomy and naming ==
Zieria southwellii was first formally described in 2002 by James Armstrong and the description was published in Australian Systematic Botany.

== Distribution and habitat ==
This zieria is found in the Lamington National Park and the Springbrook area in Queensland and in as far south as the Dorrigo Plateau in New South Wales. It grows near rainforests and in adjacent wet sclerophyll forest.
