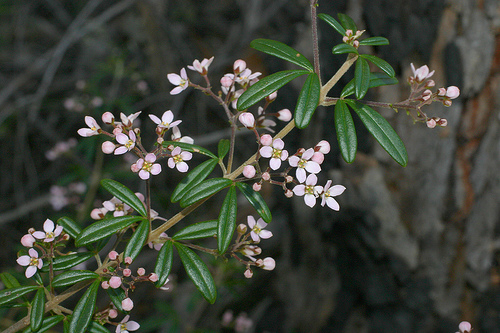
- Near Douglas Park

Scientific classification
- Kingdom: Plantae
- Clade: Tracheophytes
- Clade: Angiosperms
- Clade: Eudicots
- Clade: Rosids
- Order: Sapindales
- Family: Rutaceae
- Genus: Zieria
- Species: Z. fraseri

Binomial name
- Zieria fraseri Hook.

Synonyms
- Zieria laevigata var. fraseri (Hook.) Domin

= Zieria fraseri =

Species of shrub

Zieria fraseri is a plant in the citrus family Rutaceae and is endemic to eastern Australia. It is a dense, bushy shrub with leaves composed of three leaflets, and white flowers with four petals and four stamens. It usually grows in rocky places on steep hills.

== Description ==
Zieria fraseri is a dense, bushy shrub which grows to a height of about 2 m (7 ft). Its leaves are composed of three narrow elliptic to narrow egg-shaped leaflets with the middle leaflet 6–35 mm (0.2–1 in) long and 2–8 mm (0.08–0.3 in) wide and the others smaller. The leaf stalk is 2–8 mm (0.08–0.3 in) long. The upper surface of the leaves is glabrous while the lower surface is covered with a dense layer of branched hairs and has an obvious mid-vein. The flowers are white to pale pink and are arranged in groups of between three and twenty or more in leaf axils. The four sepal lobes are about 2 mm (0.08 in) long and hairy on the outside. The four petals are about 5 mm (0.2 in) long, 1–4 mm (0.04–0.2 in) wide and in common with other zierias, there are only four stamens. Flowering occurs in spring and is followed by fruit which is a glabrous follicle dotted with oil glands.

== Taxonomy and naming ==
Zieria fraseri was first formally described in 1848 by William Jackson Hooker in Thomas Mitchell's Journal of an Expedition into the Interior of Tropical Australia from a specimen collected on Mount Barney. Hooker did not give a reason for the specific epithet (fraseri) but the type specimen was collected by Charles Fraser.

There are two subspecies:

- Zieria fraseri (Hook) subsp. fraseri which has leaves which are longer than the groups of flowers;
- Zieria fraseri subsp. robusta (C.T.White) Duretto and P.I.Forst. which has leaves which are shorter than the groups of flowers.

== Distribution and habitat ==
This zieria grows in forest on rocky ridges and near cliffs in the McPherson Range in New South Wales and the Scenic Rim in Queensland.
