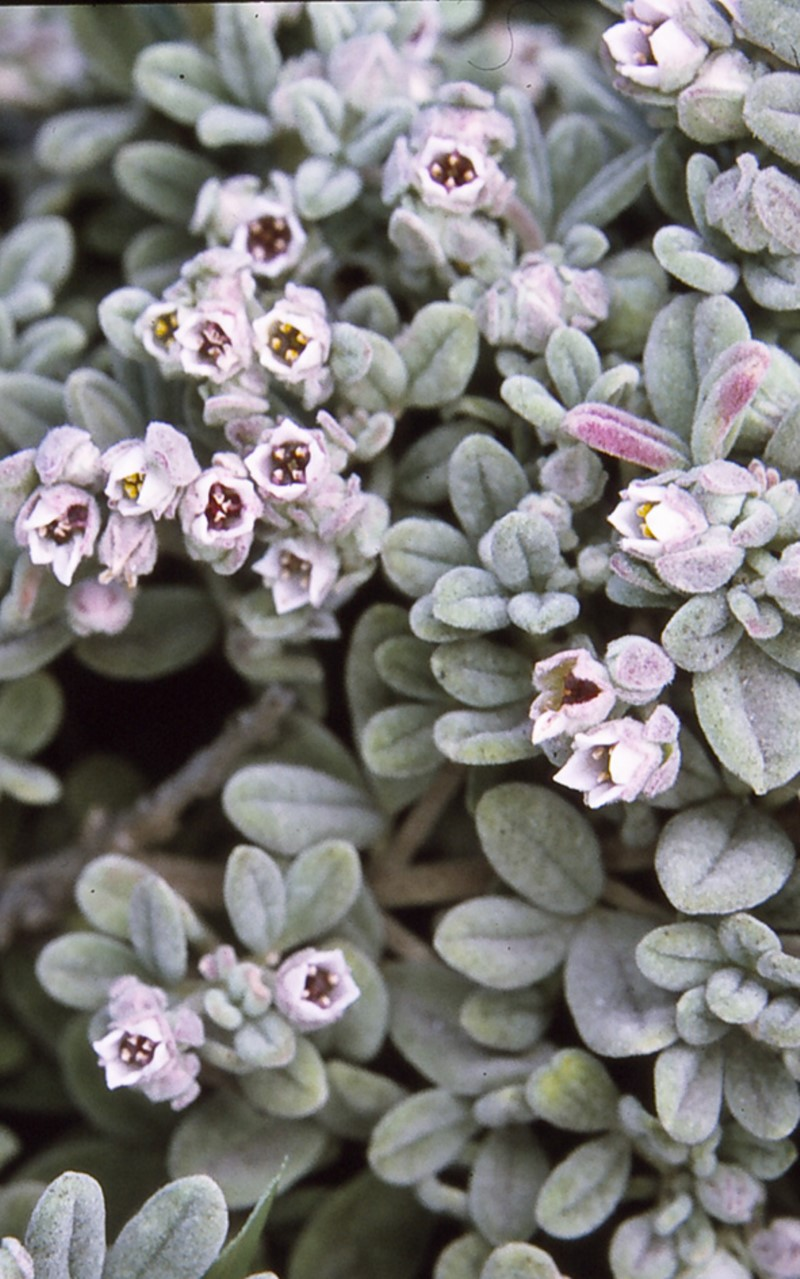
- Zieria littoralis growing at Green Cape

Scientific classification
- Kingdom: Plantae
- Clade: Tracheophytes
- Clade: Angiosperms
- Clade: Eudicots
- Clade: Rosids
- Order: Sapindales
- Family: Rutaceae
- Genus: Zieria
- Species: Z. littoralis

Binomial name
- Zieria littoralis J.A.Armstr.

= Zieria littoralis =

Dwarf zieria

Species of flowering plant

Zieria littoralis, commonly known as dwarf zieria is a plant in the citrus family Rutaceae and is endemic to south-eastern Australia. It is an erect or spreading shrub with velvety, three-part, clover-like leaves and clusters of up to thirty white or pale pink flowers with four petals and four stamens. It grows on exposed, rocky coastal headlands.

== Description ==
Zieria littoralis is an erect or spreading shrub which grows to a height of 0.2–2 m (0.7–7 ft). Its branches are covered with velvety hairs, at least when young. The leaves are also velvety and are composed of three egg-shaped leaflets with a petiole 1–3 mm (0.04–0.1 in) long. The central leaflet is 4–20 mm (0.2–0.8 in) long, 2–9 mm (0.08–0.4 in) wide. Both surfaces of the leaflets are warty and covered with velvety hairs but the upper surface is a darker green than the lower one. The edges of the leaflets are rolled under. The flowers are arranged in clusters of between three and thirty in leaf axils, the clusters usually shorter than the leaves. The sepals are triangular, about 2.5 mm (0.1 in) long and covered with woolly hairs. The four petals are white to pale pink, 3–5 mm (0.1–0.2 in) long and hairy on the outer surface, glabrous on the inner one. There are four stamens. Flowering occurs from winter to early summer and is followed by fruit which are hairy capsules.

== Taxonomy and naming ==
Zieria littoralis was first formally described in 2002 by James Armstrong from a specimen collected near the Green Cape lighthouse and the description was published in Australian Systematic Botany. The specific epithet (littoralis) is a Latin word meaning "of the seashore".

== Distribution and habitat ==
This zieria grows on exposed, rocky coastal headlands south from Tathra in New South Wales, on the far north east coast of Victoria, on Gabo Island and on the central east coast of Tasmania.
