= Zieria insularis =

Scientific classification
- Kingdom: Plantae
- Clade: Tracheophytes
- Clade: Angiosperms
- Clade: Eudicots
- Clade: Rosids
- Order: Sapindales
- Family: Rutaceae
- Genus: Zieria
- Species: Z. insularis

Binomial name
- Zieria insularis Duretto & P.I.Forst.

Species of shrub

Zieria insularis is a plant in the citrus family Rutaceae and endemic to tropical north-eastern Queensland. It is an open, straggly shrub with wiry or spindly branches, three-part leaves and between one and a few white flowers with four petals and four stamens arranged in the leaf axils. It mostly grows near granite outcrops which are surrounded by forest or rainforest.

== Description ==
Zieria insularis is an open, straggly shrub which grows to a height of 2 m (7 ft) and has wiry or spindly branches which are covered with long, soft hairs. The leaves are composed of three elliptic to narrow egg-shaped or lance-shaped leaflets. The leaves have a petiole 2–4 mm (0.08–0.2 in) long and the central leaflet is 8–21 mm (0.3–0.8 in) long and 2–6 mm (0.08–0.2 in) wide. The upper side of the leaflets is mostly glabrous and the lower side is slightly hairy. The flowers are white and are arranged singly or in groups in leaf axils on a stalk 5–20 mm (0.2–0.8 in) long. The sepals are triangular, 1 mm (0.04 in) long and wide and the four petals are elliptic in shape, 3 mm (0.1 in) long and about 1.5 mm (0.06 in) wide with scattered, star-like hairs on both surfaces. The four stamens are about 1 mm (0.04 in) long. Flowering occurs from January to July and is followed by fruit which is a more or less glabrous capsule 3–4 mm (0.1–0.2 in) long and about 2 mm (0.08 in) wide.

== Taxonomy and naming ==
Zieria insularis was first formally described in 2007 by Marco Duretto and Paul Irwin Forster from a specimen collected in the Mount Windsor National Park adjacent to the Daintree National Park and the description was published in Austrobaileya. The specific epithet (insularis) is a Latin word meaning "of islands" referring to the species often occurring near "islands" of granite.

== Distribution and habitat ==
This zieria grows near granite outcrops which are surrounded by rainforest, near granite outcrops in forest and on granite ridges in open forest. It is only known from the Mount Windsor tableland and the nearby Daintree National Park.
