= Zieria actites =

Conservation status
- Vulnerable (NCA)

Scientific classification
- Kingdom: Plantae
- Clade: Tracheophytes
- Clade: Angiosperms
- Clade: Eudicots
- Clade: Rosids
- Order: Sapindales
- Family: Rutaceae
- Genus: Zieria
- Species: Z. actites

Binomial name
- Zieria actites Duretto & P.I.Forst.

Species of shrub

Zieria actites is a plant in the citrus family Rutaceae and is only found on a single, isolated mountain in Queensland. It is a dense, compact shrub with wiry branches, three-part leaves and small, cream to pale pink flowers with four petals and four stamens.

== Description ==
Zieria actites is a dense, compact shrub which grows to a height of 1 m (3 ft) and has erect, wiry branches. The leaves have three parts, resembling clover leaves and have a smell like aniseed. The central leaflet is 13–28 mm (0.5–1 in) long, 6.5–11 mm (0.3–0.4 in) wide with the other two leaflets slightly smaller. The leaflets have a distinct mid-vein on the lower surface and transparent oil glands. The leaf stalk is 2–10 mm (0.08–0.4 in) long.

The flowers are cream to pale pink and are arranged in leaf axils in groups of between nine and twenty on a stalk 8–20 mm (0.3–0.8 in) long. The four petals are narrow elliptical in shape, about 2 mm (0.08 in) long and hairy near their edges and the four stamens are less than 1 mm (0.04 in) long. Flowering mainly occurs from September to May and is followed by fruit which is a glabrous capsule, about 3 mm (0.1 in) long and 2 mm (0.08 in) wide.

== Taxonomy and naming ==
Zieria actites was first formally described in 2007 by Marco Duretto and Paul Irwin Forster from a specimen collected on Mount Larcom, 5 km (3 mi) north-west of Yarwun and the description was published in Austrobaileya. The specific epithet (actites) is said to be derived from the Greek word actites, meaning "watcher", referring to the fact that the Pacific Ocean can be seen from the mountain tops where this species occurs. In Ancient Greek, aktitēs (ἀκτίτης) is however the word for "dweller on the coast".

== Distribution and habitat ==
This zieria grows in open woodland in crevices on rocky cliffs and outcrops on Mount Larcom, higher than about 630 m (2,000 ft) above sea leavel.

== Conservation ==
This zieria is listed as "vulnerable" under the Queensland Nature Conservation Act 1992. It is not listed under the Environment Protection and Biodiversity Conservation Act 1999.
