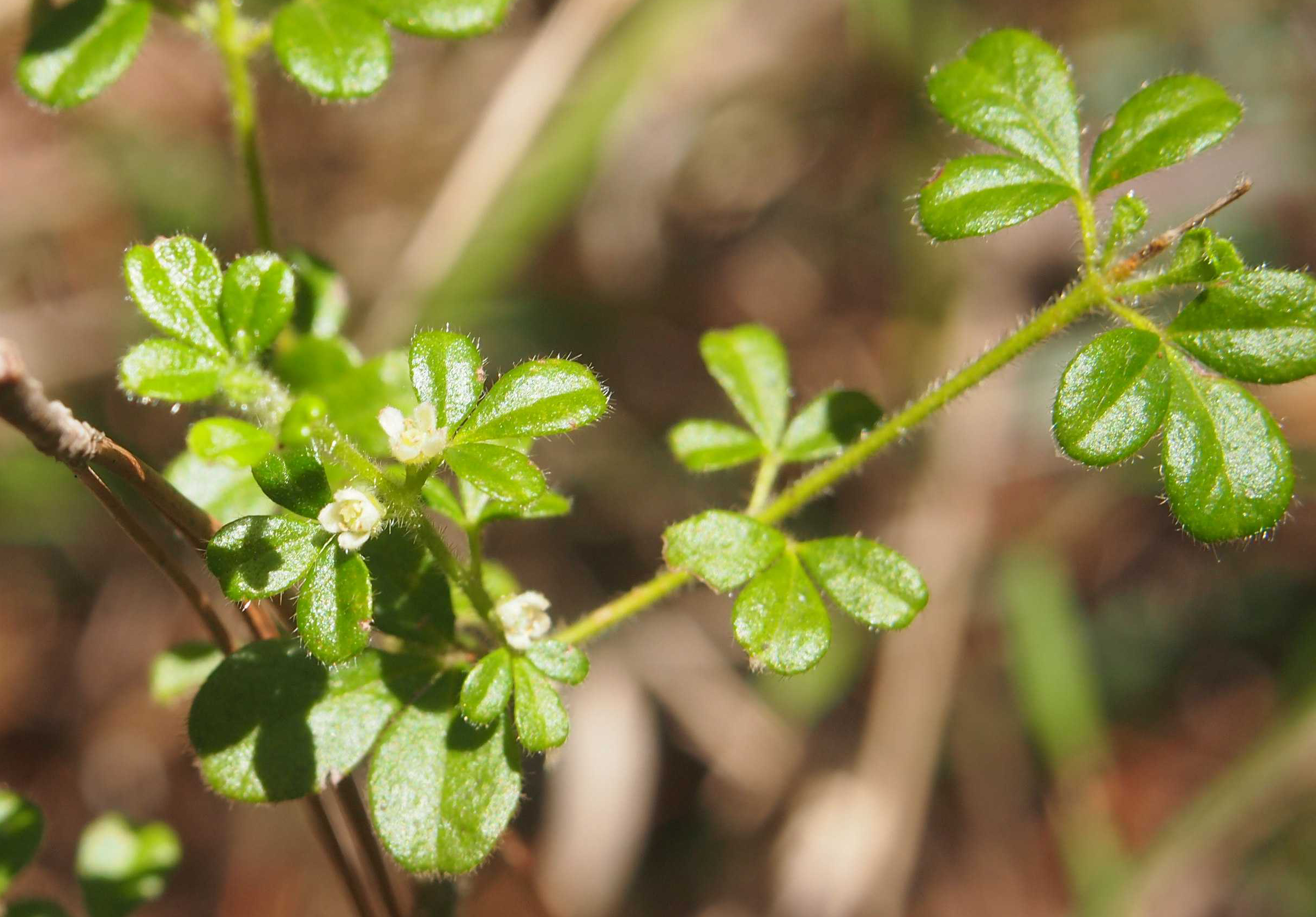
- Z. minutiflora leaves and flowers

Scientific classification
- Kingdom: Plantae
- Clade: Tracheophytes
- Clade: Angiosperms
- Clade: Eudicots
- Clade: Rosids
- Order: Sapindales
- Family: Rutaceae
- Genus: Zieria
- Species: Z. minutiflora

Binomial name
- Zieria minutiflora Domin

= Zieria minutiflora =

Twiggy zieria

Species of flowering plant

Zieria minutiflora, commonly known as twiggy zieria, is a plant in the citrus family Rutaceae and is endemic to eastern Australia. It is a small, erect, twiggy shrub with leaves composed of three leaflets, and clusters of small white flowers with four petals and four stamens. It usually grows as an understorey shrub in eucalypt woodland.

== Description ==
Zieria minutiflora is an erect, twiggy shrub which grows to a height of about 1 m (3 ft). The branches are hairy at first but become glabrous with age. Its leaves are composed of three leaflets with the middle leaflet 6–10.5 mm (0.2–0.4 in) long and 4–6 mm (0.16–0.24 in) wide. The leaf stalk is 1.5–2 mm (0.06–0.08 in) long. The upper surface of the leaves has scattered hairs and the lower surface is covered with soft hairs. The leaflets have a rounded or sometimes a notched end .

The flowers are white to pale pink or cream-coloured and are arranged singly or in groups of up to three in leaf axils. The groups are shorter than the leaves. The four sepal lobes are about 0.5 mm (0.02 in) long and the four petals are 1.5–2 mm (0.06–0.08 in) long and covered with short, branched hairs. In common with other zierias there are only four stamens. Flowering occurs from November to May and is followed by fruit which is a glabrous follicle composed of up to four sections joined at the base and which burst open to release their seeds when ripe.

== Taxonomy and naming ==
Zieria minutiflora was first formally described in 1926 by Karel Domin from a specimen collected near the Glasshouse Mountains. (The species was first described by Ferdinand von Mueller as Boronia minutiflora but the name was not validly published.) The specific epithet (minutiflora) is derived from the Latin words minutus meaning "little" or "small" and flora meaning "flowers".

Two subspecies have been described:

- Zieria minutiflora Dominsubsp. minutiflora which has a glabrous ovary and fruit;
- Zieria minutiflora subsp. trichocarpa J.A.Armstr. which has a hairy ovary and fruit and only occurs in Queensland.

== Distribution and habitat ==
Twiggy zieria mainly occurs north from Coffs Harbour in New South Wales and as far north in Queensland as Danbulla National Park and State Forest on the Atherton Tableland. It usually grows in eucalypt forest and woodland but also occurs in rocky coastal areas.
