= Zieria eungellaensis =

Conservation status
- Critically Endangered (NCA)

Scientific classification
- Kingdom: Plantae
- Clade: Tracheophytes
- Clade: Angiosperms
- Clade: Eudicots
- Clade: Rosids
- Order: Sapindales
- Family: Rutaceae
- Genus: Zieria
- Species: Z. eungellaensis

Binomial name
- Zieria eungellaensis Duretto & P.I.Forst.

Species of flowering plant

Zieria eungellaensis, commonly known as Eungella stink bush, is a plant in the citrus family Rutaceae and is only found on a few isolated mountains in Queensland. It is a compact but open shrub with wiry branches, three-part leaves and flowers in small groups, each flower white or pink with four petals and four stamens, and is endemic to the Eungella National Park.

== Description ==
Zieria eungellaensis is a compact but open shrub which grows to a height of 2 m (7 ft) and has rough, wiry branches which are sometimes hairy. The leaves have a petiole 2–8 mm (0.08–0.3 in) long and a central leaflet which is elliptic to egg-shaped, 5–16 mm (0.2–0.6 in) long, 3–8 mm (0.1–0.3 in) wide with the other two leaflets slightly smaller. Only the midvein is distinct on the lower surface and unlike some other zierias, the leaf surface is not obviously warty.

The flowers are white and are arranged singly or in groups of two or three in leaf axils on a slightly warty stalk 1–3 mm (0.04–0.1 in) long, the groups shorter than the leaves. The sepals are mostly glabrous, less than 1 mm (0.04 in) long and wide and the four petals are elliptic in shape, 2.5–3.5 mm (0.098–0.14 in) long, 1.2–1.5 mm (0.05–0.06 in) wide, varying between populations. The four stamens are about 1 mm (0.04 in) long. Flowering occurs between May and August and is followed by fruit which is a glabrous capsule, about 3 mm (0.1 in) long and 2 mm (0.08 in) wide.

== Taxonomy and naming ==
Zieria eungellaensis was first formally described in 2007 by Marco Duretto and Paul Irwin Forster from a specimen collected on Mount William in the Eungella National Park. The description was published in Austrobaileya. The specific epithet (eungellaensis) is a reference to the range of this species in the Eungella National Park.

== Distribution and habitat ==
This zieria grows in rock crevices surrounded by dense, heathy vegetation on mountain summits in the Eungella National Park. Plants have been seen on Mount William, Mount David and Mount Dalrymple.

== Conservation status ==
Zieria eungellaensis is listed as "critically endangered" under the Queensland Nature Conservation Act 1992. It was changed from least concern to critically endangered in 2020 by the Queensland Government. It is not classified under the Australian Government Environment Protection and Biodiversity Conservation Act 1999
