= Zieria graniticola =

Conservation status
- Endangered (NCA)

Scientific classification
- Kingdom: Plantae
- Clade: Tracheophytes
- Clade: Angiosperms
- Clade: Eudicots
- Clade: Rosids
- Order: Sapindales
- Family: Rutaceae
- Genus: Zieria
- Species: Z. graniticola

Binomial name
- Zieria graniticola J.A.Armstr. ex Duretto & P.I.Forst.

Species of shrub

Zieria graniticola is a plant in the citrus family Rutaceae and is a dense, compact shrub with erect wiry branches, three-part leaves and pale pink flowers in groups of up to three, each with four petals and four stamens. It is only known from two population near Stanthorpe in Queensland, Australia.

== Description ==
Zieria graniticola is a dense compact shrub which grows to a height of 1 m (3 ft) and has erect, wiry branches which are densely covered with hairs. The leaves are composed of three narrow elliptic to narrow lance-shaped leaflets with the narrower end towards the base, 6–18 mm (0.2–0.7 in) long and 1–4 mm (0.04–0.2 in) wide with a petiole 1–3 mm (0.04–0.1 in) long. Both sides of the leaflets are more or less glabrous, sometimes with a few hairs on the mid-vein. The flowers are pale pink and are arranged singly or in groups of two or three in leaf axils, each flower on a hairy stalk 1–5 mm (0.04–0.2 in) long. The sepals have a few hairs and are about 1 mm (0.04 in) long and wide. The four petals are elliptic in shape, about 4 mm (0.16 in) long, 2 mm (0.08 in) wide, covered with star-shaped hairs on both sides and the four stamens are about 1 mm (0.04 in) long. Flowering occurs between August and November and is followed by fruit which is a more or less glabrous capsule, about 4 mm (0.2 in) long and 2 mm (0.08 in) wide in October and November.

== Taxonomy and naming ==
Zieria graniticola was first formally described in 2007 by Marco Duretto and Paul Irwin Forster from an unpublished manuscript of James Armstrong. The type specimen was collected in the Passchendale State Forest near Stanthorpe and the description was published in Austrobaileya. The specific epithet (graniticola) is a reference to the habitat of this species. The suffix -cola is a Latin word meaning "dweller".

== Distribution and habitat ==
This zieria grows in open forest with a shrubby understorey. It occurs in two disjunct populations north and south of Stanthorpe, growing in sandy soil over granite.

== Conservation ==
Zieria graniticola is listed as "endangered" under the Queensland Nature Conservation Act 1992.
