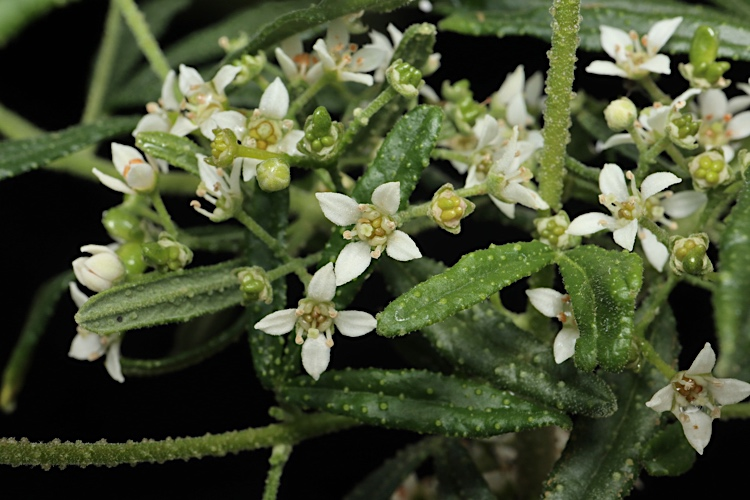
- In the Australian National Botanic Gardens

Conservation status
- Endangered (EPBC Act)

Scientific classification
- Kingdom: Plantae
- Clade: Tracheophytes
- Clade: Angiosperms
- Clade: Eudicots
- Clade: Rosids
- Order: Sapindales
- Family: Rutaceae
- Genus: Zieria
- Species: Z. floydii

Binomial name
- Zieria floydii J.A.Armstr.

= Zieria floydii =

Floyd's zieria

Species of flowering plant

Zieria floydii, commonly known as the Floyd's zieria, is a plant in the citrus family Rutaceae and is endemic to the New England Tableland in New South Wales. It is an erect shrub with warty, hairy branches, three-part, clover-like leaves and clusters of creamy-white flowers with four petals and four stamens.

== Description ==
Zieria floydii is an erect shrub which usually grows to a height of 2 m (7 ft). Its younger branches are densely covered with warty lumps and star-like hairs, including on the warts. The leaves are composed of three leaflets with the central one narrow elliptic to lance-shaped, 17–25 mm (0.7–1 in) long, about 3 mm (0.1 in) wide and with a petiole 4–6 mm (0.16–0.24 in) long. The leaflets are slightly warty-hairy on the upper surface and densely warty on the lower surface with the mid-vein covered with star-like hairs.

Creamy-white flowers about 4 mm (0.2 in) in diameter are arranged in clusters of between 20 and 80 in leaf axils. The clusters are shorter than the leaves. The sepals are triangular, less than 1 mm (0.04 in) long and warty. The four petals are about 2.5 mm (0.1 in) long, overlap each other and are densely hairy. There are four stamens. Flowering occurs mainly in November.

== Taxonomy and naming ==
Zieria floydii was first formally described in 2002 by James Armstrong from a specimen collected near Big Scrub Creek in the Guy Fawkes River National Park. The description was published in Australian Systematic Botany. The specific epithet (floydii) honours the Australian botanist, Alex Floyd who collected the type specimen.

== Distribution and habitat ==
Floyd's zieria is only known from the Guy Fawkes and Chaelundi National Parks where it mostly grows on the margins of dry rainforest, sometimes in wet forest or heath.

== Conservation ==
This zieria is listed as "Endangered" under the New South Wales Threatened Species Conservation Act and under the Commonwealth Government Environment Protection and Biodiversity Conservation Act 1999 (EPBC) Act. Some of the threats to the species are inappropriate fire regimes, grazing by feral goats (Capra hircus) and land clearing.
