= Zieria fordii =

Conservation status
- Endangered (NCA)

Scientific classification
- Kingdom: Plantae
- Clade: Tracheophytes
- Clade: Angiosperms
- Clade: Eudicots
- Clade: Rosids
- Order: Sapindales
- Family: Rutaceae
- Genus: Zieria
- Species: Z. fordii

Binomial name
- Zieria fordii Duretto

Species of shrub

Zieria fordii, commonly known as Ford's stink bush, is a species of flowering plant that is endemic to North Queensland in Australia. It is a shrub with many stems, densely covered with star shaped hairs, hairy trifoliate leaves, white flowers borne singly or in groups of up to three and hairy fruits containing a shiny seed.

== Description ==
Zieria fordii is a multi-stemmed shrub that typically grows to a height of up to 1.6 m (5 ft 3 in) and is densely covered with star shaped hairs. The leaves are trifoliate, on a petiole up to 1.5 mm (0.059 in) long. The leaflets are elliptic to egg-shaped with the narrower end towards the base, 9–20 mm (0.35–0.79 in) long and 3–9 mm (0.12–0.35 in) wide with veins visible on the lower surface. The flowers are borne singly or in groups of up to three in leaf axils, the groups on a peduncle 1–2 mm (0.039–0.079 in) long, the individual flowers on a pedicel 1–3 mm (0.039–0.118 in) long. The sepals are 2–4 mm (0.079–0.157 in) long and both surfaces are densely covered with star shaped hairs. The petals are white, 2.0–2.5 mm (0.079–0.098 in) long and densely covered with star-shaped hairs on the lower surface. Flowering has been observed from January to July, and the fruits are about 3.5 mm (0.14 in) long and about 1.5 mm (0.059 in) wide, containing a shiny black to grey seed about 2.5 mm (0.098 in) long and about 1.5 mm (0.059 in) wide.

== Taxonomy ==
Zieria fordii was first formally described in 2019 my Marco Duretto, from specimens he collected north-west of Emerald in 2009. The specific epithet (fordii) honours Andrew Ford, "whose keen botanical eye, broad knowledge and excellent and numerous herbarium collections have added significantly to our knowledge of the Queensland flora".

== Distribution and habitat ==
This species of Zieria is found in exposed heath and scattered mallee and is confined to Mount Emerald, about 50 km (31 mi) south-west of Cairns.

== Conservation status ==
Zieria fordii is listed as "endangered" under the Queensland Nature Conservation Act 1992. It was changed from least concern to "critically endangered" in 2020 by the Queensland Government. It was then changed again in June 2025 to "endangered". It is not classified under the Australian Government Environment Protection and Biodiversity Conservation Act 1999.
