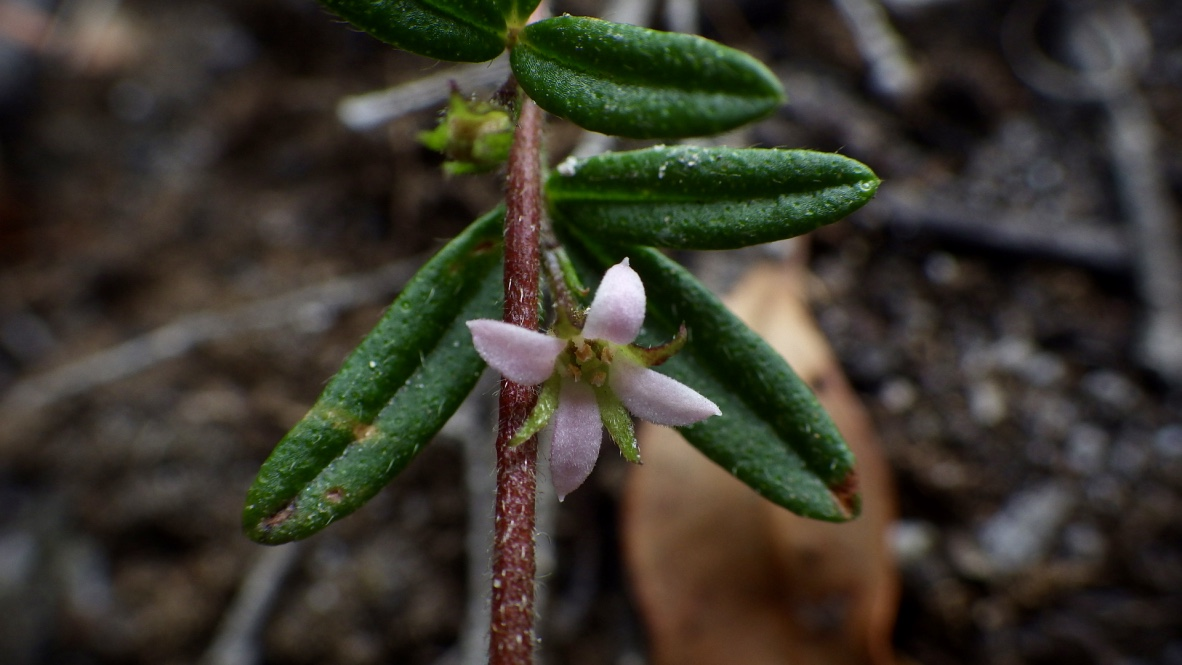
- Zieria pilosa growing on Beecroft Peninsula

Scientific classification
- Kingdom: Plantae
- Clade: Tracheophytes
- Clade: Angiosperms
- Clade: Eudicots
- Clade: Rosids
- Order: Sapindales
- Family: Rutaceae
- Genus: Zieria
- Species: Z. pilosa

Binomial name
- Zieria pilosa Rudge

= Zieria pilosa =

Hairy zieria

Species of shrub

Zieria pilosa, commonly known as hairy zieria or pilose-leafed zieria, is a plant in the citrus family Rutaceae and is endemic to coastal New South Wales. It is a shrub with hairy branches, leaves composed of three leaflets and usually only single white to pale pink flowers in the leaf axils.

== Description ==
Zieria pilosa is a shrub which grows to a height of 1 m (3 ft) and has smooth, hairy branches which become glabrous as they age. The leaves are composed of three linear to lance-shaped leaflets with a petiole 1–4 mm (0.04–0.2 in) long. The central leaflet is 10–25 mm (0.4–1 in) long and 2–7 mm (0.08–0.3 in) wide, the leaves with a petiole 0.5–2 mm (0.02–0.08 in) long. The upper surface of the leaflets is flat, dark green and more or less glabrous while the lower surface is a paler green and hairy. The flowers are white to pale pink and are usually arranged singly in leaf axils and are shorter than the leaves. There are four hairy, narrow triangular sepal lobes 2–3 mm (0.08–0.1 in) long and four petals 3–4 mm (0.1–0.2 in) long. The petals are covered with soft hairs. In common with other zierias, there are only four stamens. Flowering mainly occurs in spring and early summer.

== Taxonomy and naming ==
Zieria pilosa was first formally described in 1811 by Edward Rudge and the description was published in Transactions of the Linnean Society of London. The specific epithet (pilosa) is a Latin word meaning "hairy".

== Distribution and habitat ==
This zieria grows in forest and heath in coastal and near-coastal districts between Taree and Eden.
