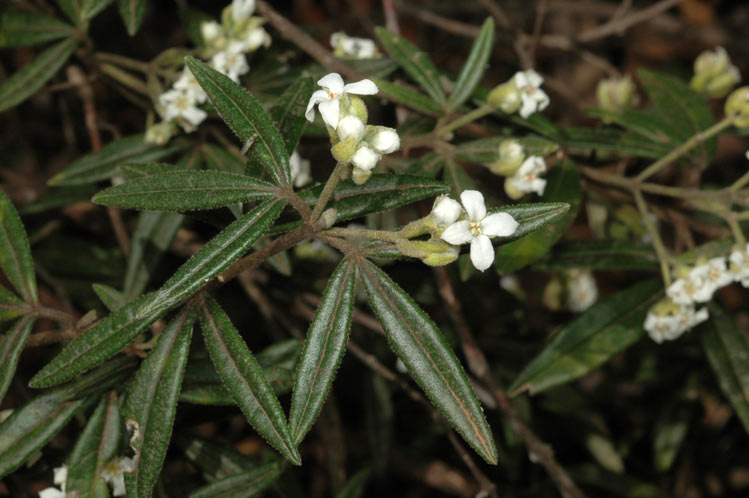

Conservation status
- Endangered (EPBC Act)

Scientific classification
- Kingdom: Plantae
- Clade: Tracheophytes
- Clade: Angiosperms
- Clade: Eudicots
- Clade: Rosids
- Order: Sapindales
- Family: Rutaceae
- Genus: Zieria
- Species: Z. covenyi

Binomial name
- Zieria covenyi J.A.Armstr.

= Zieria covenyi =

Covenyi's zieria

Species of flowering plant

Zieria covenyi, commonly known as the Coveny's zieria, is a plant in the citrus family Rutaceae and is endemic to a small area in the Blue Mountains of New South Wales. It is an erect shrub which multiples asexually from root suckers and has three-part, clover-like leaves and clusters of white to pink flowers with four petals and four stamens.

== Description ==
Zieria covenyi is an erect shrub which usually grows to a height of 2 m (7 ft) and only reproduces from root suckers. It has star-shaped hairs on its branches and leaves, at least when they are young. The leaves are arranged in opposite pairs and are composed of three leaflets with the central one heart-shaped with the narrower end towards the base, 25–35 mm (0.98–1.4 in) long and 8–10 mm (0.3–0.4 in) wide and with a petiole 7–10 mm (0.3–0.4 in) long. The leaflets are dark green with small oil glands on the upper surface and grey-green with soft hairs on the lower surface.

White to pale pink flowers, 10–13 mm (0.4–0.5 in) in diameter are arranged in clusters of between 3 and 21 in leaf axils. The clusters are about the same length as the leaves. The sepals are triangular, about 4 mm (0.2 in) long and covered with soft hairs. The four petals are about 6 mm (0.2 in) long, overlap each other and have a layer of hairs on the outside and there are four stamens. Flowering occurs from October to December and although insects have been observed visiting the flowers they have not carried fertile pollen from this species and fruit has not been recorded.

== Taxonomy and naming ==
Covenyi's zieria was first formally described in 2002 by James Andrew Anderson from a specimen collected near Bomaderry Creek. The description was published in Australian Systematic Botany. The specific epithet (covenyi) honours the Australian herbarium collector, Robert George Coveny who, with James Armstrong, collected the type specimen.

== Distribution and habitat ==
Zieria covenyi is only known from two populations totalling about 270 plants on Narrow Neck Peninsula in the Blue Mountains, where it grows in sandy soil in eucalypt woodland.

== Conservation ==
Covenyi's zieria is listed as "endangered" under the New South Wales Threatened Species Conservation Act and under the Commonwealth Government Environment Protection and Biodiversity Conservation Act 1999 (EPBC) Act. Some of the threats to the species are habitat damage due to road maintenance, frequent fires and the inability of the species to reproduce from seed.
