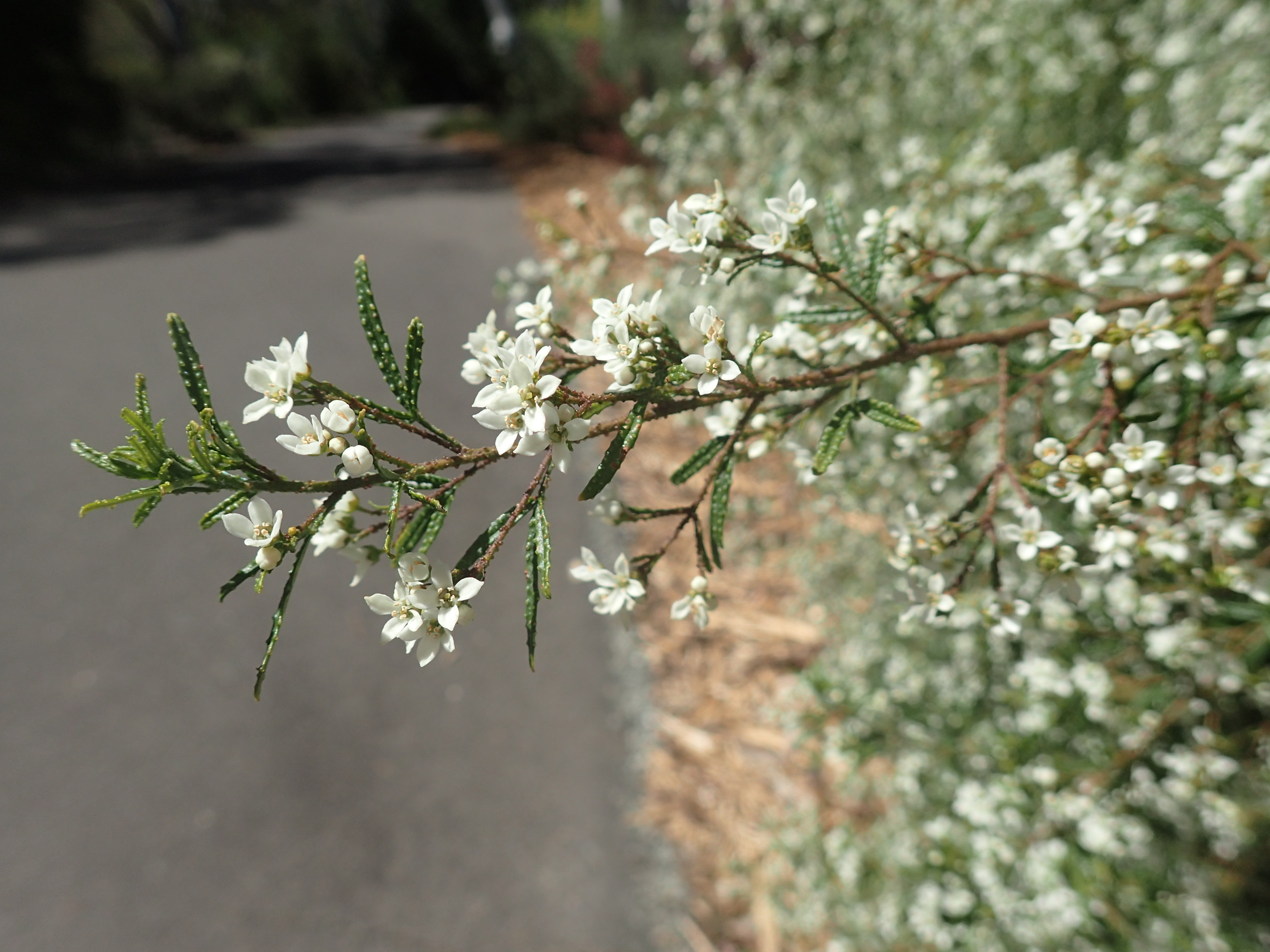

Scientific classification
- Kingdom: Plantae
- Clade: Tracheophytes
- Clade: Angiosperms
- Clade: Eudicots
- Clade: Rosids
- Order: Sapindales
- Family: Rutaceae
- Genus: Zieria
- Species: Z. adenodonta

Binomial name
- Zieria adenodonta (F.Muell.) J.A.Armstr.

= Zieria adenodonta =

Wollumbin zieria

Species of flowering plant

Zieria adenodonta, commonly known as the Wollumbin zieria, is a plant in the citrus family Rutaceae and is endemic to eastern Australia. It is a dense, bushy shrub with leaves composed of three leaflets which are warty on the upper surface. In winter and early spring it has groups of five to eight flowers, each with four white petals, the groups usually shorter than the leaves.

== Description ==
Zieria adenodonta is a dense, bushy shrub which grows to a height of 3 m (10 ft) and has warty branchlets. The leaves are composed of three leaflets with the central one, 10–20 mm (0.4–0.8 in) long and 1.5–3 mm (0.06–0.1 in) wide with a stalk 3–7 mm (0.1–0.3 in) long. The leaflets are dark green and warty on the upper surface, light green and not wary on the lower side. The edges of the leaflets are slightly rolled under and have small teeth. They have an unpleasant smell when crushed.

The flowers are white and are arranged in upper leaf axils, usually in groups of five to eight, but sometimes as many as 27. The groups are usually shorter than the leaves. There are four more or less hairy, triangular sepal lobes less than 1.0 mm (0.04 in) long. The four petals are about 2.5 mm (0.1 in) long and slightly hairy. In common with other zierias, there are only four stamens. Flowering occurs from May to September and is followed by the fruit which is a yellow-brown, egg-shaped capsule containing one black seed.

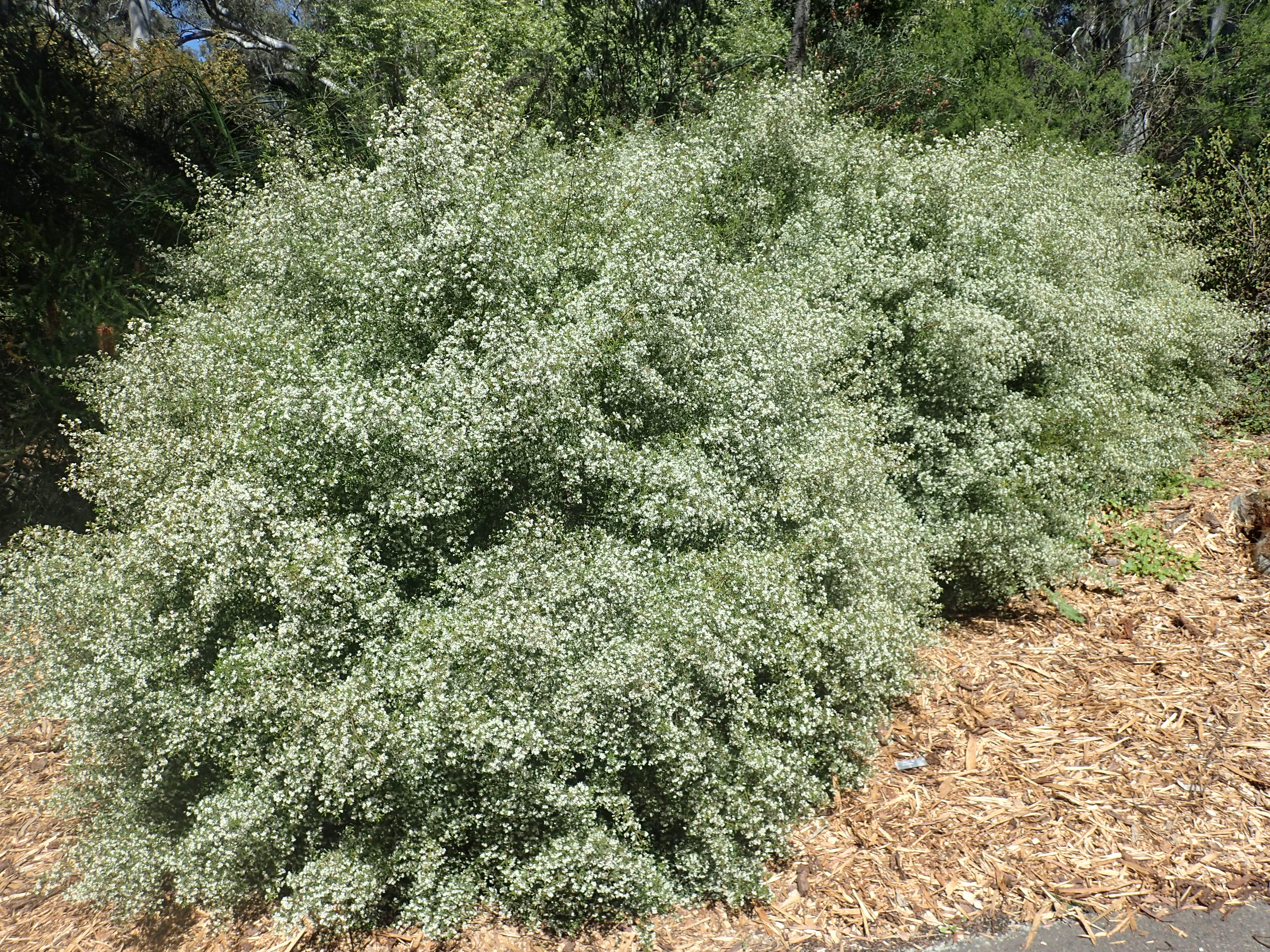
Habit in the Australian National Botanic Gardens

== Taxonomy and naming ==
Wollumbin zieria was first formally described in 1875 by Ferdinand von Mueller who gave it the name Zieria granulata var. adenodonta and published the description in Fragmenta phytographiae Australiae. In 2002, James Armstrong raised it to species status and published the change in Australian Systematic Botany. The specific epithet (adenodonta) is derived from the Ancient Greek words aden meaning "gland" and odous meaning "tooth".

== Distribution and habitat ==
Zieria adenodonta occurs in the Lamington National Park in Queensland and on Mount Warning in New South Wales, growing in dense shrubby vegetation on steep slopes.

== Conservation ==
Wollumbin zieria is listed as "endangered" under the New South Wales Threatened Species Conservation Act 1995. It is listed as "near threatened" under the Queensland Nature Conservation Act 1992. It is not listed under the Environment Protection and Biodiversity Conservation Act 1999.
