= Zieria obovata =

Conservation status
- Vulnerable (EPBC Act)

Scientific classification
- Kingdom: Plantae
- Clade: Tracheophytes
- Clade: Angiosperms
- Clade: Eudicots
- Clade: Rosids
- Order: Sapindales
- Family: Rutaceae
- Genus: Zieria
- Species: Z. obovata

Binomial name
- Zieria obovata (C.T.White) J.A.Armstr.

Synonyms
- Zieria aspalathoides var. obovata (C.T.White)

Species of shrub

Zieria obovata is a plant in the citrus family Rutaceae and is endemic to Queensland. It is a small, open shrub with leaves composed of three leaflets, and with up to three cream-coloured to pale pink flowers with four petals and four stamens. It usually grows on steep, rocky slopes in wet open forest.

== Description ==
Zieria obovata is an open shrub which grows to a height of about 1 m (3 ft). The branches are hairy especially when young. Its leaves are composed of egg-shaped leaflets with the thinner end towards the base. The petiole is absent or less than 1 mm (0.04 in) long and the central leaflet is 6–13 mm (0.2–0.5 in) long and 2–4 mm (0.08–0.2 in) wide. The upper surface of the leaves is dark green and more or less glabrous while the lower surface is a paler green and hairy. The flowers are cream-coloured to pale pink and are arranged singly or in groups of up to three in leaf axils. The groups are longer than the leaves and have a hairy stalk 3–28 mm (0.1–1 in) long. The flowers are surrounded by leaf-like bracts and the four sepal lobes are triangular and about 0.5 mm (0.02 in) long. The four petals are 1.5 mm (0.06 in) long and in common with other zierias, there are only four stamens. Flowering mainly occurs from September to March and is followed by fruit which is a more or less glabrous follicle.

== Taxonomy and naming ==
This zieria was first formally described in 1942 by Cyril Tenison White and given the name Zieria aspalathoides var. obovata. The description was published in Proceedings of the Royal Society of Queensland from a specimen collected near Herberton. In 2002, James Armstrong raised the variety to species status. The specific epithet (obovata) derived from the Latin word ovata meaning "egg-shaped" with the prefix ob- meaning "towards".

== Distribution and habitat ==
Zieria obovata grows in wet open forest often on steep, rocky granite slopes. It is found in two areas within 10 km (6 mi) of Herberton.

== Conservation ==
This zieria is listed as "vulnerable" under the Queensland Nature Conservation Act 1992 and under the Commonwealth Government Environment Protection and Biodiversity Conservation Act 1999 (EPBC) Act. The main threat to its survival is stochastic events because of the species' limited distribution.
