= Zieria verrucosa =

Conservation status
- Vulnerable (EPBC Act)

Scientific classification
- Kingdom: Plantae
- Clade: Tracheophytes
- Clade: Angiosperms
- Clade: Eudicots
- Clade: Rosids
- Order: Sapindales
- Family: Rutaceae
- Genus: Zieria
- Species: Z. verrucosa

Binomial name
- Zieria verrucosa J.A.Armstr.

Species of shrub

Zieria verrucosa is a plant in the citrus family Rutaceae and is endemic to a small area of Queensland. It is a densely-branched, hairy shrub with three-part, clover-like leaves and large groups of creamy-white to pink, four-petalled flowers.

== Description ==
Zieria verrucosa many-branched, hairy shrub which grows to a height of 1.5 m (5 ft). The leaves are composed of three narrow leaflets with the central one, 8–50 mm (0.3–2 in) long and 1–5 mm (0.04–0.2 in) wide. The upper surface of the leaflets is dark green with scattered hairs and the lower surface is whitish and velvety-hairy. The leaves are covered with glands and many small lumps or tubercules and are strongly scented, especially when crushed. The flowers are arranged in the leaf axils in groups of up to 60 but the flowers are small and the groups are shorter than the leaves. The flowers are creamy-white to pink and 4–6 mm (0.16–0.24 in) in diameter. Flowering occurs between August and February and the fruits which follow are glabrous capsules with many glands.

== Taxonomy and naming ==
Zieria verrucosa was first formally described in 2002 by James Armstrong and the description was published in Australian Systematic Botany. The specific epithet (verrucosa) is a Latin word meaning "full of warts".

== Distribution and habitat ==
This zieria is only known from a small area near Mundubbera where it grows in vine thicket, Eucalyptus crebra or ironbark woodland.

== Conservation ==
Zieria verrucosa is listed as "vulnerable" under the Commonwealth Government Environment Protection and Biodiversity Conservation Act 1999 (EPBC) Act and under the Queensland Nature Conservation Act 1992. The main threats to the species are land clearing, cattle grazing and inappropriate fire regimes.
