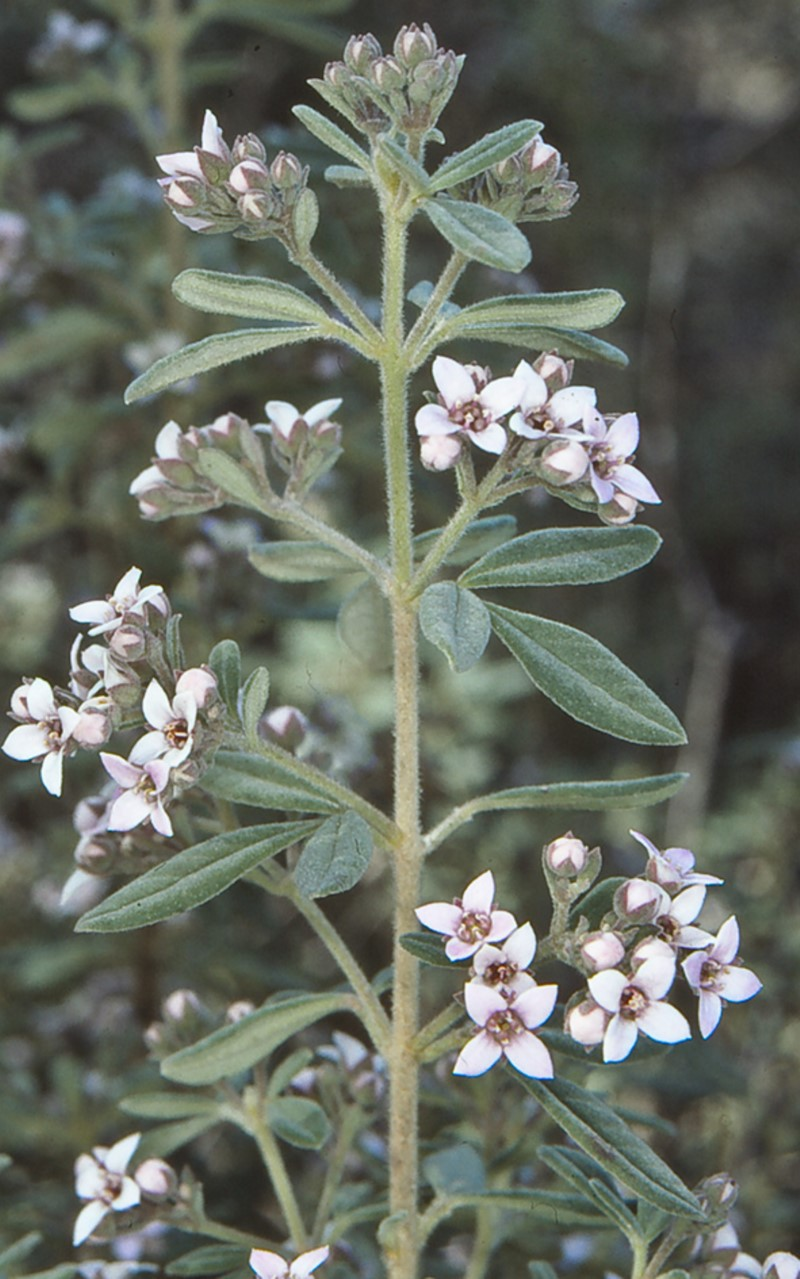
- Near Bega

Scientific classification
- Kingdom: Plantae
- Clade: Tracheophytes
- Clade: Angiosperms
- Clade: Eudicots
- Clade: Rosids
- Order: Sapindales
- Family: Rutaceae
- Genus: Zieria
- Species: Z. cytisoides

Binomial name
- Zieria cytisoides Sm.

= Zieria cytisoides =

Downy zieria

Species of flowering plant

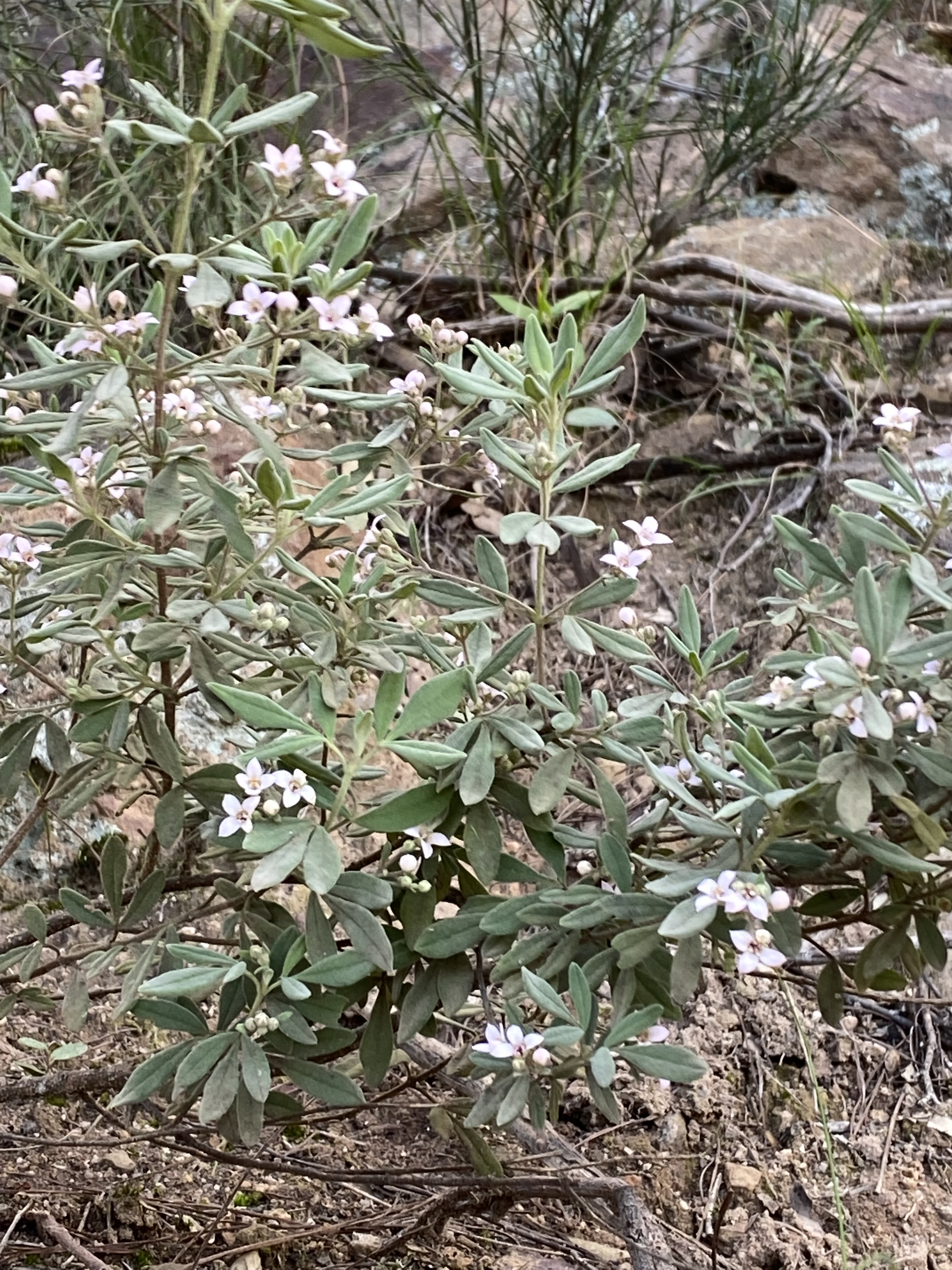
Habit

Zieria cytisoides, commonly known as downy zieria, is a plant in the citrus family Rutaceae and is endemic to eastern Australia. It is a bushy shrub with three-part, clover-like leaves and small clusters of pale to deep pink flowers with four petals and four stamens.

== Description ==
Zieria cytisoides is a bushy shrub which usually grows to a height of up to 3 m (10 ft) with its branches covered with velvety hairs. The leaves are composed of three leaflets with the central one elliptic to egg-shaped, 15–40 mm (0.6–2 in) long and 4–15 mm (0.2–0.6 in) wide and with a petiole 3–11 mm (0.1–0.4 in) long. The leaflets are flat, sometimes with their edges rolled under. They are dark green and covered with short, soft hairs on the upper surface and grey-green, covered with velvety hairs on the lower surface.

Pale to deep pink, rarely white flowers are arranged in clusters of between 3 and 30 in leaf axils with a persistent bract 8–10 mm (0.3–0.4 in) at the base of the cluster. The clusters are about the same length as the leaves, but often longer or shorter. The sepals are triangular, about 3 mm (0.1 in) long and covered with soft hairs. The four petals are 3.5–5.5 mm (0.1–0.2 in) long, have a covering of soft hairs and do not overlap each other. There are four stamens. Flowers are present in winter and spring and are followed by velvety follicles containing black to reddish-brown seeds.

== Taxonomy and naming ==
Downy zieria was first formally described in 1818 by James Edward Smith and the description was published in The Cyclopaedia. The specific epithet (cytisoides) alludes to a similarity between this species and one of the genus Cytisus, but the connection is not clear. (The suffix -oides means "likeness" in Latin.)

== Distribution and habitat ==
Zieria cytisoides occurs in Queensland, New South Wales and Victoria. It is most common and widespread in New South Wales where it grows in forest woodland and heath, often in sandy soil on rocky slopes from coastal areas to the western slopes of the Great Dividing Range.

== Use in horticulture ==
This zieria is most easily propagated from cuttings and is hardy in well-drained soil in full sun or part shade. In the Australian National Botanic Gardens it grows as a compact shrub with little pruning and is resistant to pests and diseases.
