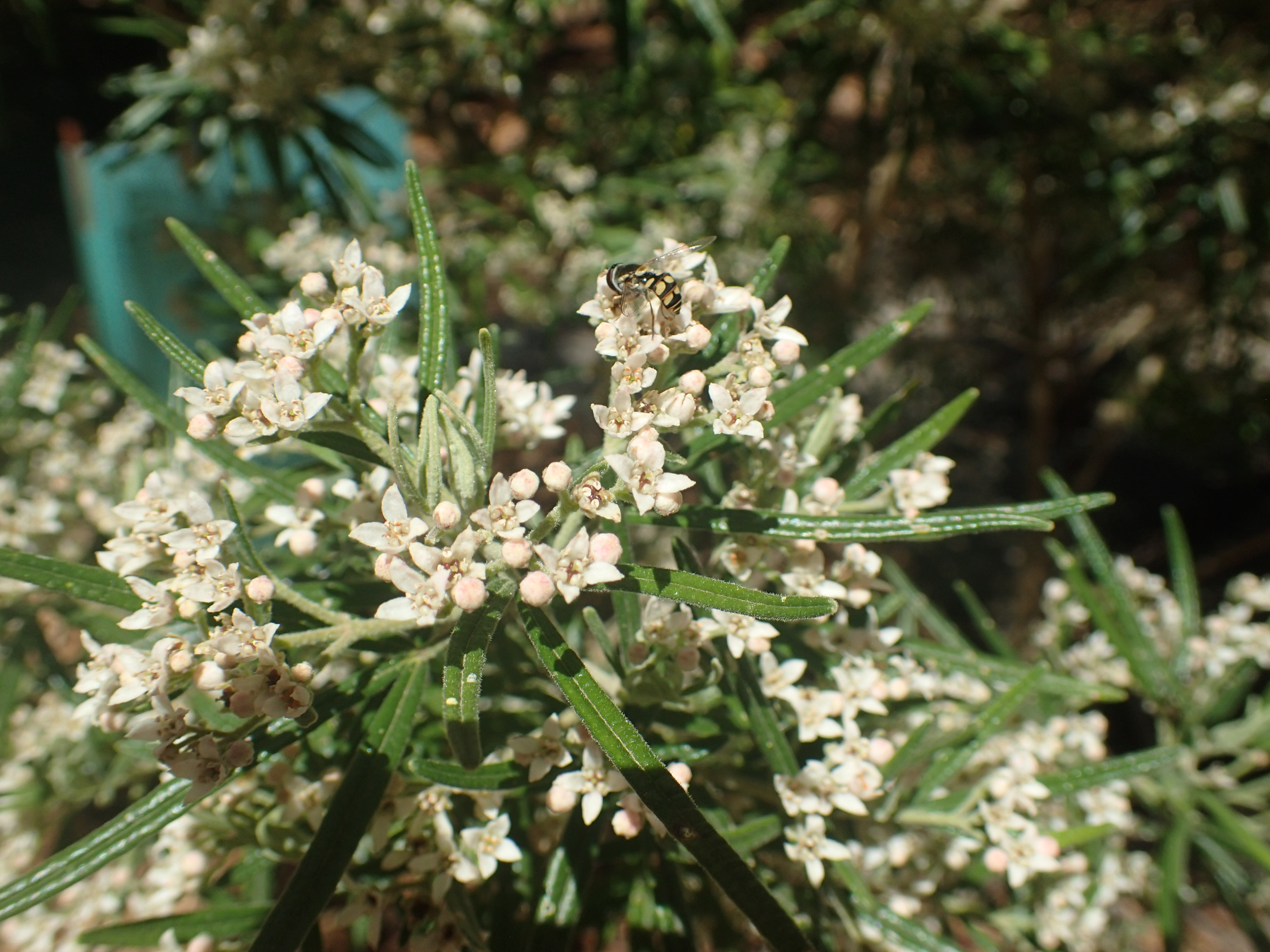
- Leaves and flowers

Conservation status
- Vulnerable (EPBC Act)

Scientific classification
- Kingdom: Plantae
- Clade: Tracheophytes
- Clade: Angiosperms
- Clade: Eudicots
- Clade: Rosids
- Order: Sapindales
- Family: Rutaceae
- Genus: Zieria
- Species: Z. tuberculata

Binomial name
- Zieria tuberculata J.A.Armstr.

= Zieria tuberculata =

Warty zieria

Species of flowering plant

Zieria tuberculata, commonly known as warty zieria, is a plant in the citrus family Rutaceae and is endemic to a small area on the south coast of New South Wales. It is a shrub with warty, hairy branches and leaves and large groups of creamy-white, four-petalled flowers in late winter to spring.

== Description ==
Zieria tuberculata is a shrub that grows to a height of 3.5 m (10 ft) and has warty branches and leaves which are also covered with star-like hairs, usually visible only with a magnifier. The leaves are composed of three narrow leaflets with the central one, 25–50 mm (1–2 in) long and 2–3.5 mm (0.08–0.1 in) wide with a stalk 4–8 mm (0.2–0.3 in) long. The leaflets are dull green on the upper surface, whitish and warty on the lower side.

The flowers are creamy-white and are arranged in upper leaf axils in large groups of up to 200. The groups are shorter than the leaves and each flower is 5.2–7.3 mm (0.2–0.3 in) in diameter on a stalk 1.1–2.5 mm (0.04–0.1 in) long. There are four narrow triangular sepal lobes less than 1.5–2.5 mm (0.06–0.1 in) long and four petals 2.5–4 mm (0.1–0.2 in) long. In common with other zierias, there are only four stamens. Flowering occurs from late winter to spring.

== Taxonomy and naming ==
Zieria tuberculata was first formally described in 2002 by James Armstrong and the description was published in Australian Systematic Botany. The specific epithet (tuberculata) is a Latin word meaning 'full of lumps'.

== Distribution and habitat ==
This zieria occurs in the Mount Gulaga area, growing in exposed, rocky outcrops on the edge of rainforest.

== Ecology ==
This species is pollinated by pollen-feeding beetles and flies and by nectar-feeding flies.

== Conservation ==
Zieria tuberculata is listed as "vulnerable" under the Commonwealth Government Environment Protection and Biodiversity Conservation Act 1999 (EPBC) Act and under the New South Wales NSW Threatened Species Conservation Act. About 900 individual plants from eight populations in an area of about 6 km^{2} (600 ha) are known. The main threats to its survival are habitat destruction caused by grazing animals and the weeds lantata (Lantana camara) and ivy (Hedera helix).
