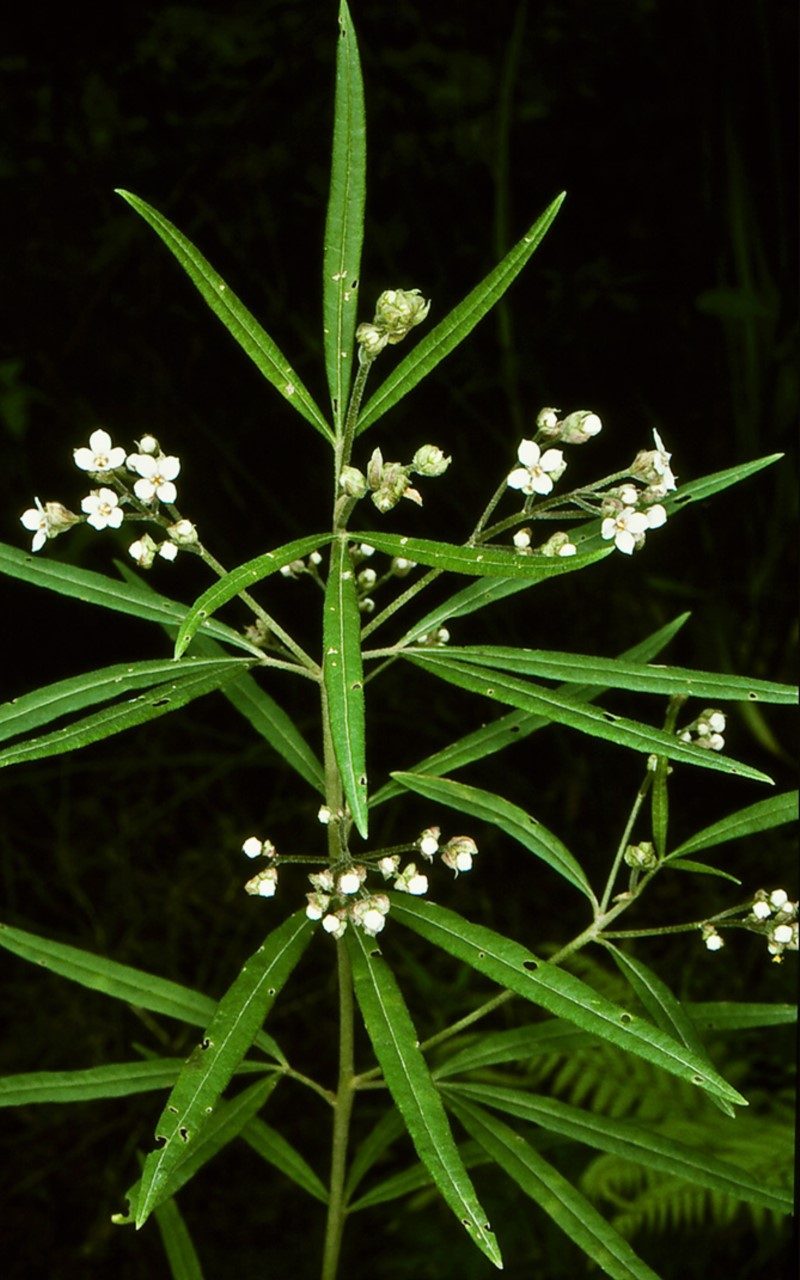
- Near Milton and Lake Conjola

Scientific classification
- Kingdom: Plantae
- Clade: Tracheophytes
- Clade: Angiosperms
- Clade: Eudicots
- Clade: Rosids
- Order: Sapindales
- Family: Rutaceae
- Genus: Zieria
- Species: Z. caducibracteata

Binomial name
- Zieria caducibracteata J.A.Armstr.

= Zieria caducibracteata =

Species of shrub

Zieria caducibracteata is a plant in the citrus family Rutaceae and is endemic to New South Wales. It is a tall shrub or small tree with leaves composed of three lance-shaped leaflets. In early spring there are clusters of small white flowers with four petals near the ends of the branches.

== Description ==
Zieria caducibracteata is a tall shrub or small tree which grows to a height of 6 m (20 ft) and has its younger branches covered with short hairs. The leaves are composed of three leaflets with the leaflets narrow elliptic to lance-shaped, 40–100 mm (2–4 in) long and 5–15 mm (0.2–0.6 in) wide with a stalk 10–15 mm (0.4–0.6 in) long. The two surfaces of the leaflets are different shades of green, the lower surface covered with velvety hairs.

The flowers are arranged in clusters which are shorter than the leaves, each flower on a stalk 5–8 mm (0.2–0.3 in) long. There are one or two bracts 8–12 mm (0.3–0.5 in) long at the base of the cluster, but the bracts fall off early in the flowering period. The sepal lobes are triangular, 2–3 mm (0.08–0.1 in) long and hairy. The four petals are 4–5 mm (0.16–0.20 in) long and covered with short, soft hairs and there are four stamens. Flowering occurs from late August to September.

== Taxonomy and naming ==
Zieria caducibracteata was first formally described in 2002 by James Andrew Armstrong from a specimen collected near the Princes Highway between Milton and Lake Conjola. The description was published in Australian Systematic Botany. The specific epithet (caducibracteata) is derived from the Latin words caducus meaning "deciduous" or "falling" and bractea meaning "scale" or "small leaf".

== Distribution and habitat ==
This zieria is found between the Colo River and the Batemans Bay district in New South Wales, where it grows in forest and the edges of rainforest in sandy soil, mainly near escarpments.
