= Zieria furfuracea =

Scientific classification
- Kingdom: Plantae
- Clade: Tracheophytes
- Clade: Angiosperms
- Clade: Eudicots
- Clade: Rosids
- Order: Sapindales
- Family: Rutaceae
- Genus: Zieria
- Species: Z. furfuracea

Binomial name
- Zieria furfuracea R.Br. ex Benth.

Synonyms
- Zieria smithii var. furfuracea (A.Cunn. ex Benth.) C.Moore & Betche

Species of shrub

Zieria furfuracea is a plant in the citrus family Rutaceae and is endemic to eastern Australia. It is a shrub with three-part leaves and groups of large numbers of small white flowers, the groups shorter than the leaves. It grows on the coast and tablelands north from Wyong.

== Description ==
Zieria furfuracea is a shrub which grows to a height of between 1 and 3 m (3 and 10 ft) with warty branches that covered with soft hairs when young. The leaves are composed of three lance-shaped leaflets 20–60 mm (0.8–2 in) long and 2–10 mm (0.08–0.4 in) wide with a petiole 5–20 mm (0.2–0.8 in) long. Both sides of the leaflets are more or less flat and covered with small, star-like leaves. The upper surface is smooth and a darker green than the lower one. The flowers are white and arranged in large groups, the groups shorter than the leaves. The sepals are triangular, less than 1 mm (0.04 in) long and the four petals are about 4 mm (0.2 in) long, covered with soft hairs and there are four stamens. Flowering occurs in spring and summer and is followed by fruits which are smooth follicles covered with soft hairs.

== Taxonomy and naming ==
Zieria furfuracea was first formally described in 1863 by George Bentham from an unpublished description by Robert Brown. Bentham's description was published in Flora Australiensis. The specific epithet (furfuracea) is derived from the Latin word furfur meaning "bran", "scurf", "scale", or "dandruff".

Three subspecies have been described:

- Zieria furfuracea subsp. furfuracea;
- Zieria furfuracea subsp. euthadenia;
- Zieria furfuracea subsp. gymnocarpa.

== Distribution and habitat ==
This zieria occurs in Queensland, New South Wales north of Wyong, growing in forest and rainforest, sometimes on exposed rocky escarpments.
