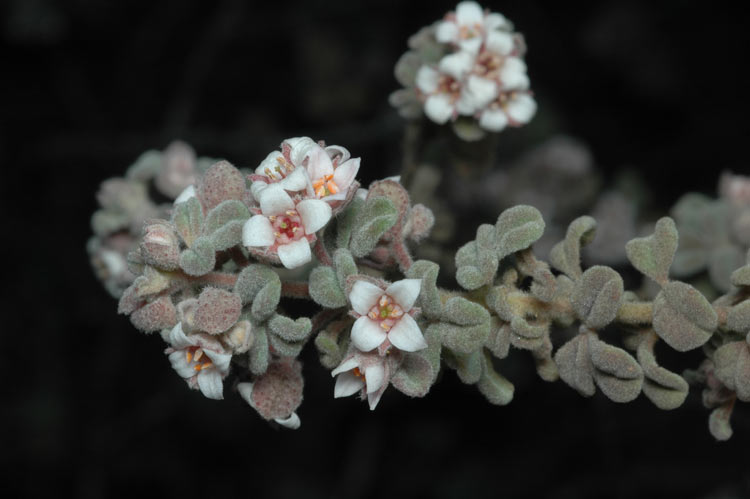

Conservation status
- Endangered (EPBC Act)

Scientific classification
- Kingdom: Plantae
- Clade: Tracheophytes
- Clade: Angiosperms
- Clade: Eudicots
- Clade: Rosids
- Order: Sapindales
- Family: Rutaceae
- Genus: Zieria
- Species: Z. baeuerlenii

Binomial name
- Zieria baeuerlenii J.A.Armstr.

= Zieria baeuerlenii =

Bomaderry zieria

Species of flowering plant

Zieria baeuerlenii, commonly known as the Bomaderry zieria, is a plant in the citrus family Rutaceae and is endemic to a small area on the south coast of New South Wales. It is a sometimes straggly shrub with velvety leaves composed of three leaflets. In late autumn to spring there are clusters of small white to pinkish flowers with four petals and which appear to be unable to produce seeds.

== Description ==
Zieria baeuerlenii is an open, spreading shrub which usually grows to a height of 0.8 m (3 ft) and has a velvety covering on its younger branches. The leaves are arranged in opposite pairs and are composed of three leaflets with the central one heart-shaped with the narrower end towards the base, 6–12 mm (0.2–0.5 in) long and 4–9 mm (0.2–0.4 in) wide with a stalk 1.5–2.5 mm (0.06–0.1 in) long. The other two leaflets are similar in shape but slightly smaller. Each leaflet has a velvety covering of hairs and has its edges rolled under.

Masses of small pinkish-white flowers about 8 mm (0.3 in) in diameter are arranged in clusters of between three and seven in leaf axils. The clusters have a stalk up to 10 mm (0.4 in) and are longer than the leaves. Four large green, leaf-like bracts surround each flower cluster. The sepals are triangular, about 2 mm (0.08 in) long and covered with velvety hairs. The four petals are broad lance-shaped, about 3 mm (0.1 in) long, overlap each other and have a layer of hairs on the outside. Flowering occurs from September to October but fruit have never been observed and evidence suggests that the species has lost its ability to reproduce sexually.

== Taxonomy and naming ==
Bomaderry zieria was first formally described in 2002 by James Andrew Anderson from a specimen collected near Bomaderry Creek. The description was published in Australian Systematic Botany. The specific epithet (baeuerlenii) honours the German-born plant collector Wilhelm Baeuerlen who moved to Australia in about 1883, lived in the Shoalhaven area and collected for Ferdinand von Mueller and Joseph Maiden.

== Distribution and habitat ==
Zieria baeuerlenii is only known from an area of 0.5 km^{2} (100 acres) near Bomaderry. In grows in soil derived from sandstone in forest, woodland and scrub.

== Ecology ==
Fruit or seed of Bomaderry Zieria has not been observed and it is thought that the species has lost the ability to reproduce sexually and probably reproduces from suckers. It has the ability to regenerate after bushfire.

== Conservation ==
Bomaderry zieria is listed as "endangered" under the New South Wales Threatened Species Conservation Act and under the Commonwealth Government Environment Protection and Biodiversity Conservation Act 1999 (EPBC) Act. Some of the threats to the species are habitat damage due to illegal activities, weed invasion, grazing by rabbits and frequent fires.
