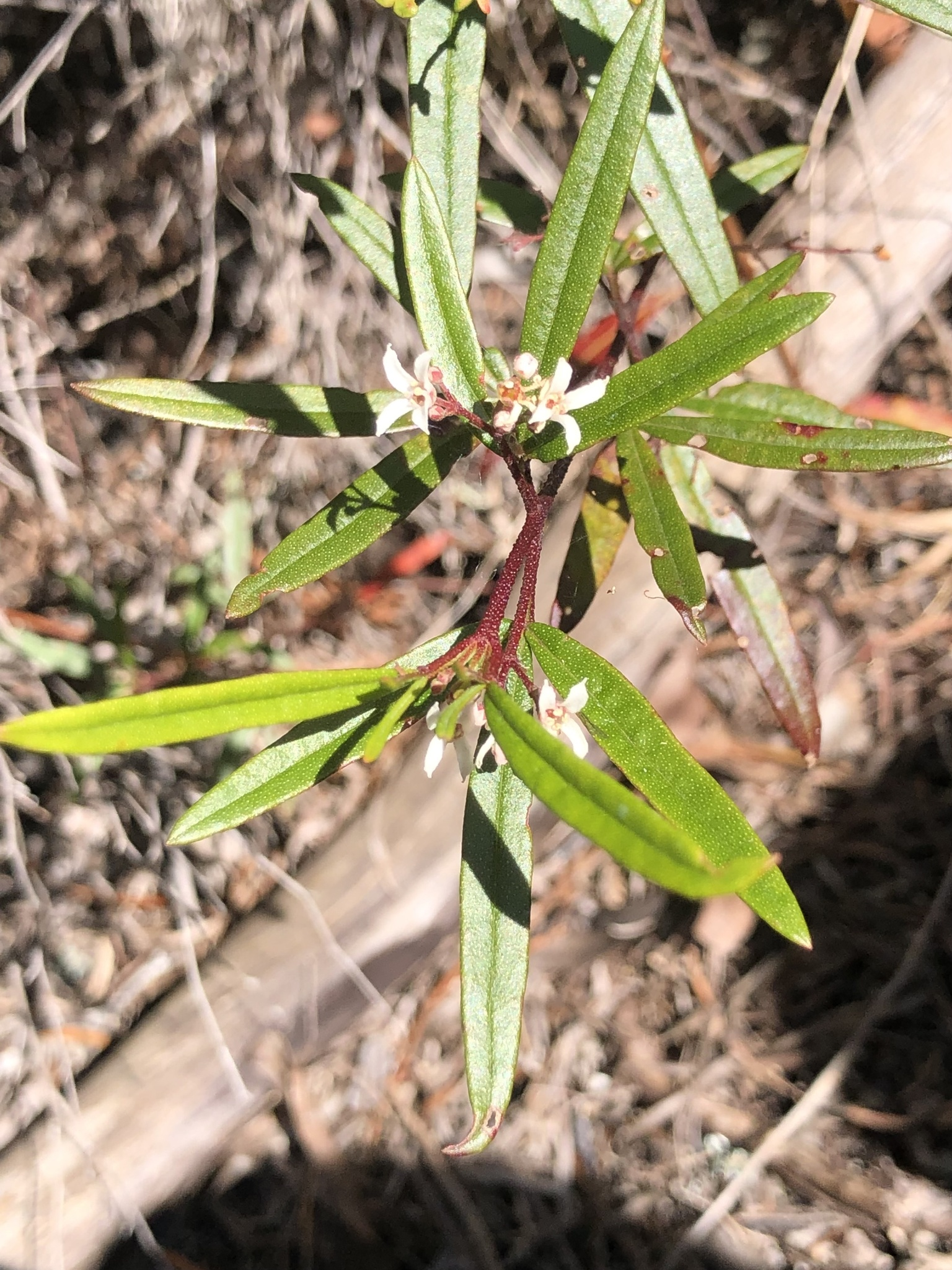

Scientific classification
- Kingdom: Plantae
- Clade: Tracheophytes
- Clade: Angiosperms
- Clade: Eudicots
- Clade: Rosids
- Order: Sapindales
- Family: Rutaceae
- Genus: Zieria
- Species: Z. hindii

Binomial name
- Zieria hindii J.A.Armstr.

= Zieria hindii =

Hind's zieria

Species of flowering plant

Zieria hindii, commonly known as the Hind's zieria, is a species of plant in the citrus family Rutaceae and is endemic to a small area in north-eastern New South Wales, Australia. It is an erect, slender shrub with warty branches, three-part, clover-like leaves, and clusters of small white flowers with four petals and four stamens. It is only known from the Nightcap Range.

== Description ==
Zieria hindii is an erect, slender shrub which usually grows to a height of 1 m (3 ft). Its branches are glabrous but covered with warty lumps. The leaves are composed of three leaflets with the central one narrow lance-shaped, 20–25 mm (0.8–1 in) long, about 3–4 mm (0.1–0.2 in) wide and with a petiole 5–10 mm (0.2–0.4 in) long. The upper surface of the leaflets is dark green and glabrous but dotted with oil glands while the lower surface is a paler green and covered with star-like hairs. The flowers are arranged in clusters of seven to thirteen (sometimes as many as 35) in leaf axils, the clusters shorter than the leaves. The sepals are triangular, less than 1 mm (0.04 in) long and more or less glabrous. The four petals are 2–3 mm (0.08–0.1 in) long with their bases overlapping each other and are covered with small, star-like hairs. There are four stamens. Flowering occurs in spring and summer and is followed by fruit which are glabrous, warty capsules.

== Taxonomy and naming ==
Zieria hindii was first formally described in 2002 by James Armstrong from a specimen collected in the Whian Whian State Forest in the Nightcap Range. The description was published in Australian Systematic Botany.

== Distribution and habitat ==
Hind's zieria is only known from the Nightcap Range where it grows on rocky hillsides.
