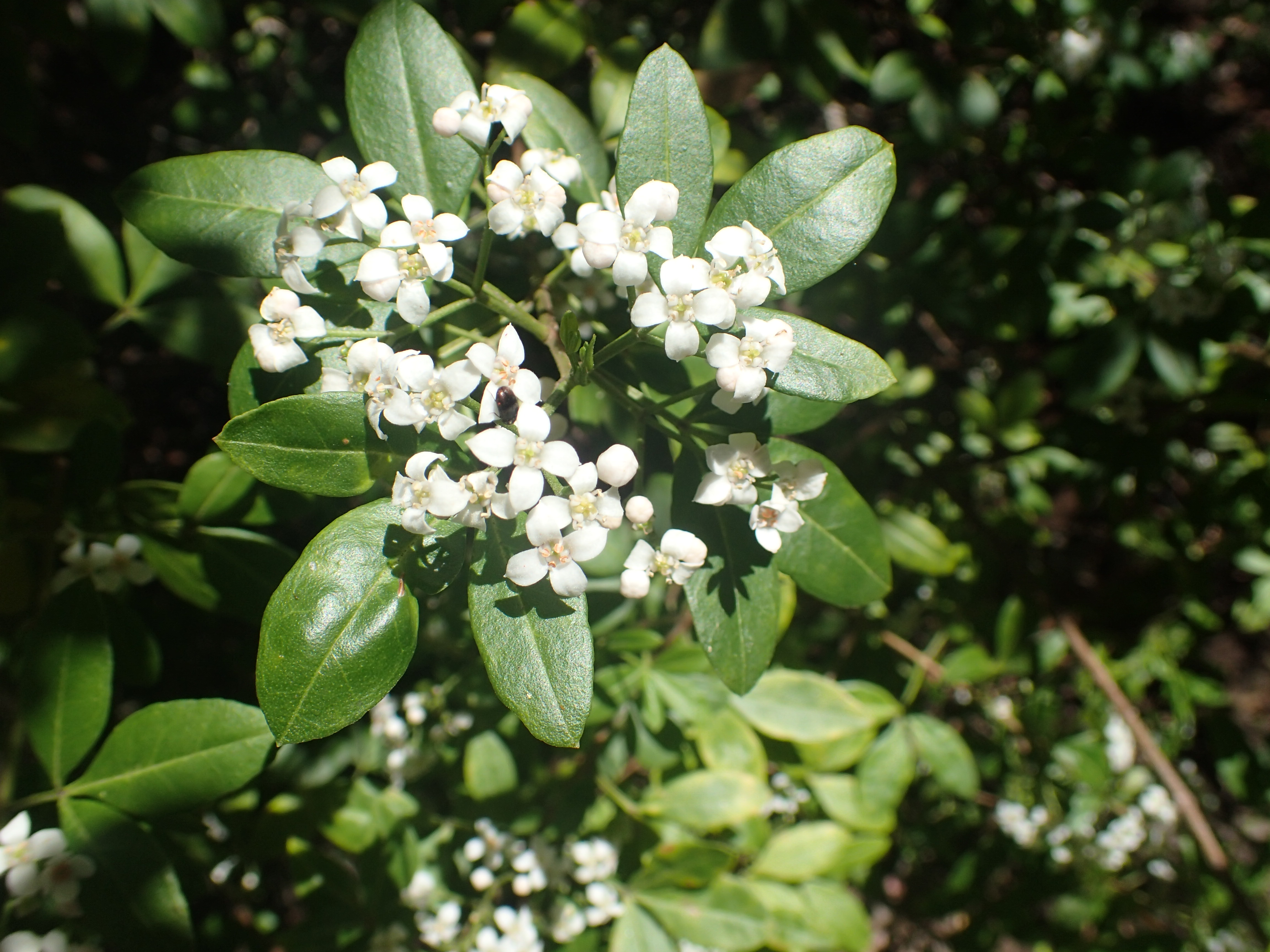
- Leaves and flowers

Conservation status
- Critically Endangered (NCA)

Scientific classification
- Kingdom: Plantae
- Clade: Tracheophytes
- Clade: Angiosperms
- Clade: Eudicots
- Clade: Rosids
- Order: Sapindales
- Family: Rutaceae
- Genus: Zieria
- Species: Z. montana

Binomial name
- Zieria montana J.A.Armstr.

= Zieria montana =

Species of shrub

Zieria montana, commonly known as Mt. Barney stink bush, is a plant in the citrus family Rutaceae and is endemic to a small area in south-east Queensland. It is a shrub with rough, ridged branches, leaves composed of three leaflets and groups of white, four-petalled flowers in spring and early summer.

== Description ==
Zieria montana is an open, compact shrub which grows to a height of 2.5 m (8 ft) and has erect, wiry branches with conspicuous ridges. The leaves are composed of three elliptic to egg-shaped leaflets with the central one, 20–45 mm (0.8–2 in) long and 10–17 mm (0.4–0.7 in) wide, the leaves with a stalk 10–20 mm (0.4–0.8 in) long. The leaflets are glabrous except for a few scattered hairs on the lower side along the mid-vein.

The flowers are white, tinged with pink and are arranged in upper leaf axils in groups of 10 to 20. The groups are shorter than the leaves and each flower is on a stalk 1.5–4 mm (0.06–0.2 in) long. There are four egg-shaped sepal lobes about 1 mm (0.04 in) long and four petals about 4 mm (0.2 in) long. In common with other zierias, there are only four stamens. Flowering occurs from September to December.

== Taxonomy and naming ==
Zieria montana was first formally described in 2002 by James Armstrong and the description was published in Australian Systematic Botany. The specific epithet (montana) is a Latin word meaning "of mountains".

== Distribution and habitat ==
This zieria occurs in the Mount Barney National Park area, growing in heath near rocky outcrops.

== Conservation ==
Zieria montana is listed as "critically endangered" under the Queensland Nature Conservation Act 1992. It was changed from vulnerable to critically endangered in 2020 by the Queensland Government. It is not classified under the Australian Government Environment Protection and Biodiversity Conservation Act 1999. The main threats to its survival are too-frequent fires and trampling by walkers.
