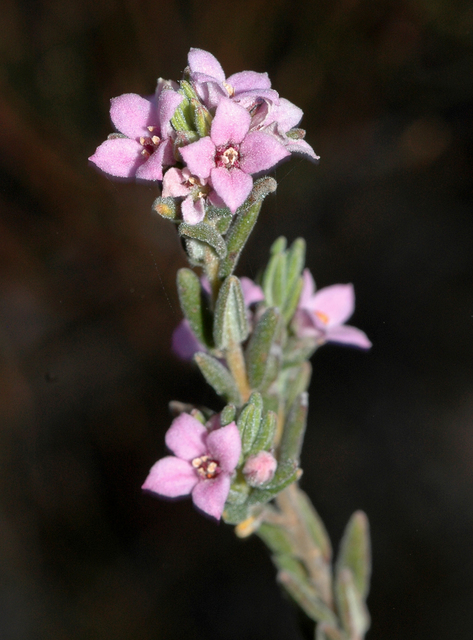
- Zieria veronicea growing in the Little Desert National Park

Scientific classification
- Kingdom: Plantae
- Clade: Tracheophytes
- Clade: Angiosperms
- Clade: Eudicots
- Clade: Rosids
- Order: Sapindales
- Family: Rutaceae
- Genus: Zieria
- Species: Z. veronicea

Binomial name
- Zieria veronicea (F.Muell.) Benth.

= Zieria veronicea =

Pink zieria

Species of flowering plant

Zieria veronicea, commonly known as pink zieria, is a plant in the citrus family Rutaceae and is endemic to south-eastern Australia. It is a small, lemon-scented shrub densely covered with velvety hairs. Up to three flowers with four pink petals appear in leaf axils in late spring.

== Description ==
Zieria veronicea is a lemon-scented shrub which grows to a height of 15–60 cm (6–20 in). Most parts of the plants are densely covered with star-like hairs making its surfaces velvety. Unlike most other zierias, this species has simple, rather than clover-like leaves. The leaves are 5–18 mm (0.2–0.7 in) long and 1–5.5 mm (0.04–0.2 in) wide with the upper surface light green and the lower one greyish green. The edges of the leaves turn down or are rolled under. The petiole is less than 1 mm (0.04 in) long. The flowers are arranged singly or in groups of three in leaf axils, the groups shorter than the leaves. The four sepals are narrow lance-shaped, 2–5.5 mm (0.08–0.2 in) long, pointed and densely velvety-hairy. The four petals are pink, sometimes white, 2.3–7 mm (0.09–0.3 in) and overlap each other in the bud stage. There are four stamens.

== Taxonomy and naming ==
Pink zieria was first formally described in 1854 by Ferdinand von Mueller who gave it the name Boronia veronicea and published the description in Transactions of the Philosophical Society of Victoria. In 1863, George Bentham changed the name to Zieria veronicea. Mueller did not give a reason for the specific epithet (veronicea).

There are two subspecies -

- Zieria veronicea subsp. veronicea and
- Zieria veronicea subsp. insularis J.A.Armstr. which only occurs on Kangaroo Island.

== Distribution and habitat ==
Zieria veronicea is most common in Victoria where it grows in sandy mallee and mallee heath in the western part of the state and near the Gippsland Lakes. It is also found in the south-east of South Australia and in eastern Tasmania where it grows in heath or heathy woodland.

== Conservation ==
Zieria veronicea is classified as "endangered" under the Tasmanian Government Threatened Species Protection Act 1995. Fewer than 200 plants are known from that state, where the main threats are land clearance and inappropriate fire regimes.
