= Zieria abscondita =

Scientific classification
- Kingdom: Plantae
- Clade: Embryophytes
- Clade: Tracheophytes
- Clade: Spermatophytes
- Clade: Angiosperms
- Clade: Eudicots
- Clade: Rosids
- Order: Sapindales
- Family: Rutaceae
- Genus: Zieria
- Species: Z. abscondita

Binomial name
- Zieria abscondita P.I.Forst.

Species of shrub

Zieria abscondita is a plant in the citrus family Rutaceae and is only known from a single location in Queensland. It is a shrub with trifoliate leaves, white flowers and warty, glabrous fruit.

== Description ==
Zieria abscondita is an open, straggly shrub that typically grows to a height of 2 m (6 ft 7 in) and has erect, wiry branches densely covered with woolly hairs. The leaves are trifoliate on a hairy petiole 5–12 mm (0.20–0.47 in) long. The central leaflet is narrowly elliptic 13–36 mm (0.51–1.42 in) long, 4–7 mm (0.16–0.28 in) wide with the other two leaflets slightly smaller. The upper surface of the leaflets has a few hairs and the lower surface has 8 to 10 obvious veins and is densely covered with simple and star-shaped hairs. Three to more than 12 flowers are borne in leaf axils on a peduncle 4–14 mm (0.16–0.55 in) long, each flower on a pedicel 1.2–2.0 mm (0.047–0.079 in) long. The sepals are egg-shaped to triangular, 0.7–1.0 mm (0.028–0.039 in) long and 0.7–0.8 mm (0.028–0.031 in) wide. The petals are white, elliptic, 1.8–2.2 mm (0.071–0.087 in) long and 0.7–1.3 mm (0.028–0.051 in) wide with a dense covering of star-shaped trichomes. The fruit is a 2.6–3.0 mm (0.10–0.12 in) long and 1.7–1.8 mm (0.067–0.071 in) wide glabrous with a few warty glands.

== Taxonomy and naming ==
Zieria abscondita was first formally described in 2020 by Paul Irwin Forster from a specimen he collected in Bloodwood Creek Nature Refuge in Crossdale in 2017. The specific epithet (abscondita) means 'hidden' or 'concealed', and "alludes to the occurrence of this species in a rocky gorge and to its late discovery".

== Distribution and habitat ==
This zieria is only known from Crossdale, where it occurs in a more or less continuous linear strip along a waterway in rocky terrain in low woodland with an overstorey of Eucalyptus dura and Lophostemon confertus.

== Conservation status ==
Zieria abscondita is listed as of "least concern" under the Queensland Nature Conservation Act 1992.
