= Zieria rimulosa =

Conservation status
- Vulnerable (EPBC Act)

Scientific classification
- Kingdom: Plantae
- Clade: Tracheophytes
- Clade: Angiosperms
- Clade: Eudicots
- Clade: Rosids
- Order: Sapindales
- Family: Rutaceae
- Genus: Zieria
- Species: Z. rimulosa

Binomial name
- Zieria rimulosa C.T.White

Species of shrub

Zieria rimulosa is a plant in the citrus family Rutaceae and is endemic to north Queensland. It is a shrub with leaves composed of three leaflets, and with white flowers with four petals and four stamens. Unlike many other zierias, its leaves are neither rough, glandular or densely hairy.

== Description ==
Zieria rimulosa is a shrub which grows to a height of about 1.5 m (5 ft) with its smaller branches rough and slightly angular. Its leaves are composed of three leaflets with the middle leaflet 5–10 mm (0.2–0.4 in) long and 3–5 mm (0.1–0.2 in) wide. The leaves are bright green and both surfaces of the leaves are mostly glabrous apart from a few hairs on the lower surface. The edges of the leaflets often have small warts and are turned slightly downwards. The flowers are white to pale pink and are arranged in groups of up to fifty flowers in leaf axils, each flower 4–6 mm (0.16–0.24 in) in diameter, the groups much longer than the leaves. The fruits are glabrous and dotted with glands. Flowers and fruits have been observed in April.

== Taxonomy and naming ==
Zieria rimulosa was first formally described in 1942 by Cyril Tenison White in Proceedings of the Royal Society of Queensland from a specimen collected on Mount Mulligan. The specific epithet (rimulosa) is a Latin word meaning "full of little fissures or cracks".

== Distribution and habitat ==
This zieria is only known from Mount Mulligan and the Mount Carbine Tableland where it grows in woodland on rocky pavements and cliffs.

== Conservation ==
Zieria rimulosa is listed as "vulnerable" under the Commonwealth Government Environment Protection and Biodiversity Conservation Act 1999 (EPBC) Act. The main threat to the species is its limited distribution.
