= Zieria distans =

Scientific classification
- Kingdom: Plantae
- Clade: Tracheophytes
- Clade: Angiosperms
- Clade: Eudicots
- Clade: Rosids
- Order: Sapindales
- Family: Rutaceae
- Genus: Zieria
- Species: Z. distans

Binomial name
- Zieria distans Duretto & P.I.Forst.

Species of shrub

Zieria distans is a plant in the citrus family Rutaceae and is only found on a few isolated mountains in Queensland, Australia. It is a straggly shrub with wiry branches, warty, three-part leaves and clusters of up to about twenty small white flowers, each with four petals and four stamens, in the leaf axils.

== Description ==
Zieria distans is an open, straggly shrub which grows to a height of 1.5 m (5 ft) and has warty, wiry branches with dense, woolly hairs on the youngest branches. The leaves have a petiole 5–12 mm (0.2–0.5 in) long with a central leaflet which is narrow elliptic in shape, 11–30 mm (0.4–1 in) long, 1.0–4.5 mm (0.04–0.2 in) wide with the other two leaflets about the same size. The upper surface of the leaflets and the raised midvein on the lower surface are warty due to the presence of glands.

The flowers are white and are arranged in groups of between about 12 and 20 in leaf axils on a warty, hairy stalk 2–8 mm (0.08–0.3 in) long, the groups shorter than the leaves. The sepals are warty and about 1 mm (0.04 in) long and the four petals are elliptic in shape, 1.8–3 mm (0.07–0.1 in) long, 1.0–1.5 mm (0.04–0.06 in) wide and covered with star-like hairs. The four stamens are about 1 mm (0.04 in) long. Flowering occurs between May and September and is followed by fruit which is a glabrous capsule, about 3.5 mm (0.1 in) long and 0.5 mm (0.02 in) wide.

== Taxonomy and naming ==
Zieria distans was first formally described in 2007 by Marco Duretto and Paul Irwin Forster from a specimen collected in the Walla Range near Coalstoun Lakes in Queensland. The description was published in Austrobaileya. The specific epithet (distans) is a Latin word meaning "being apart" or "well separated" and refers to the location of this species on well separated mountain tops and ridges.

== Distribution and habitat ==
This zieria grows in rocky places on mountain tops and ridges in woodland and shrubland in the South East Queensland biogeographic region. There are disjunct populations on the Walla Range, Coongara Rock, Kroombit Tops, Westwood Range and Mount Roberts.

== Conservation ==
Zieria distans is listed as "least concern" under the Queensland Nature Conservation Act 1992.
