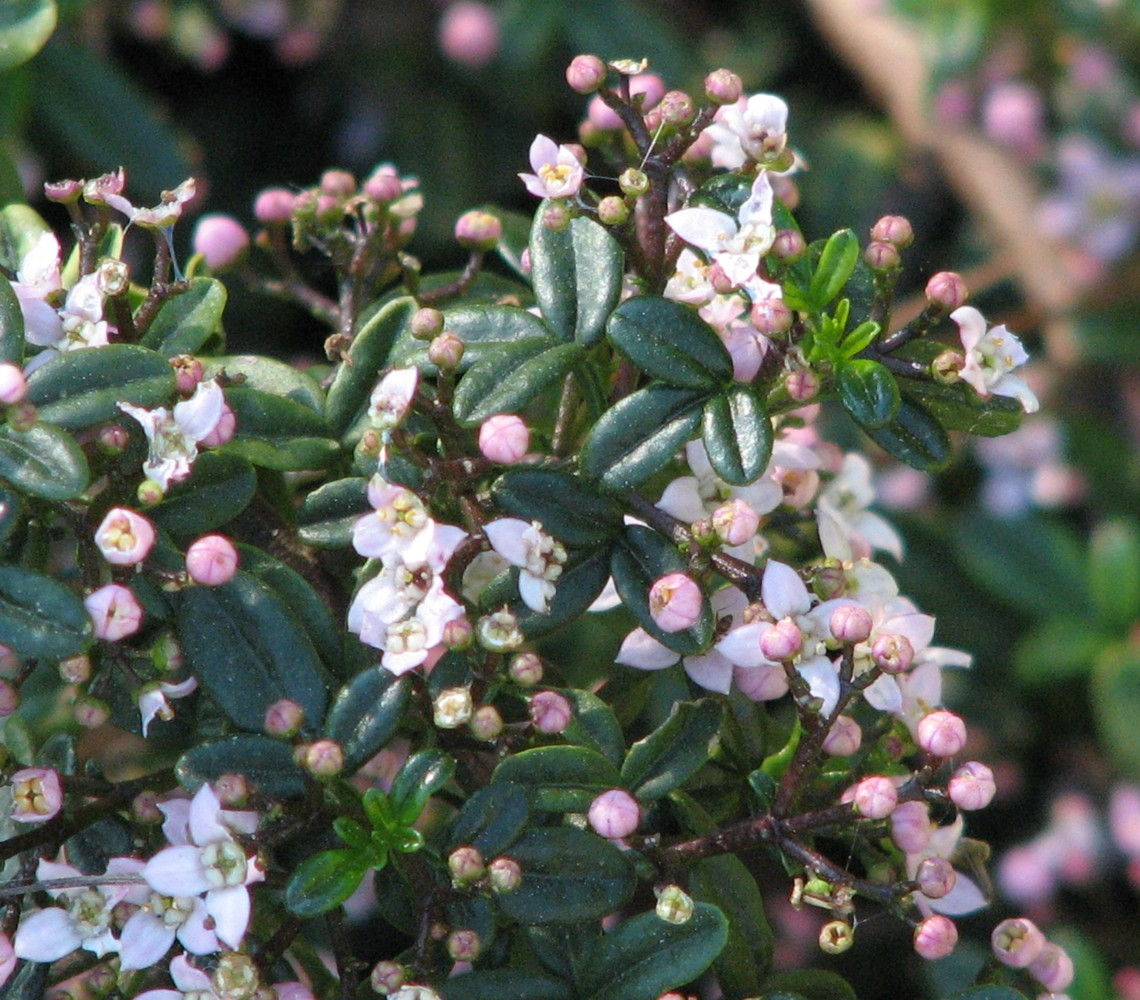
- Zieria prostrata

Scientific classification
- Kingdom: Plantae
- Clade: Tracheophytes
- Clade: Angiosperms
- Clade: Eudicots
- Clade: Rosids
- Order: Sapindales
- Family: Rutaceae
- Subfamily: Zanthoxyloideae
- Genus: Zieria; Sm.

= Zieria =

Genus of flowering plants

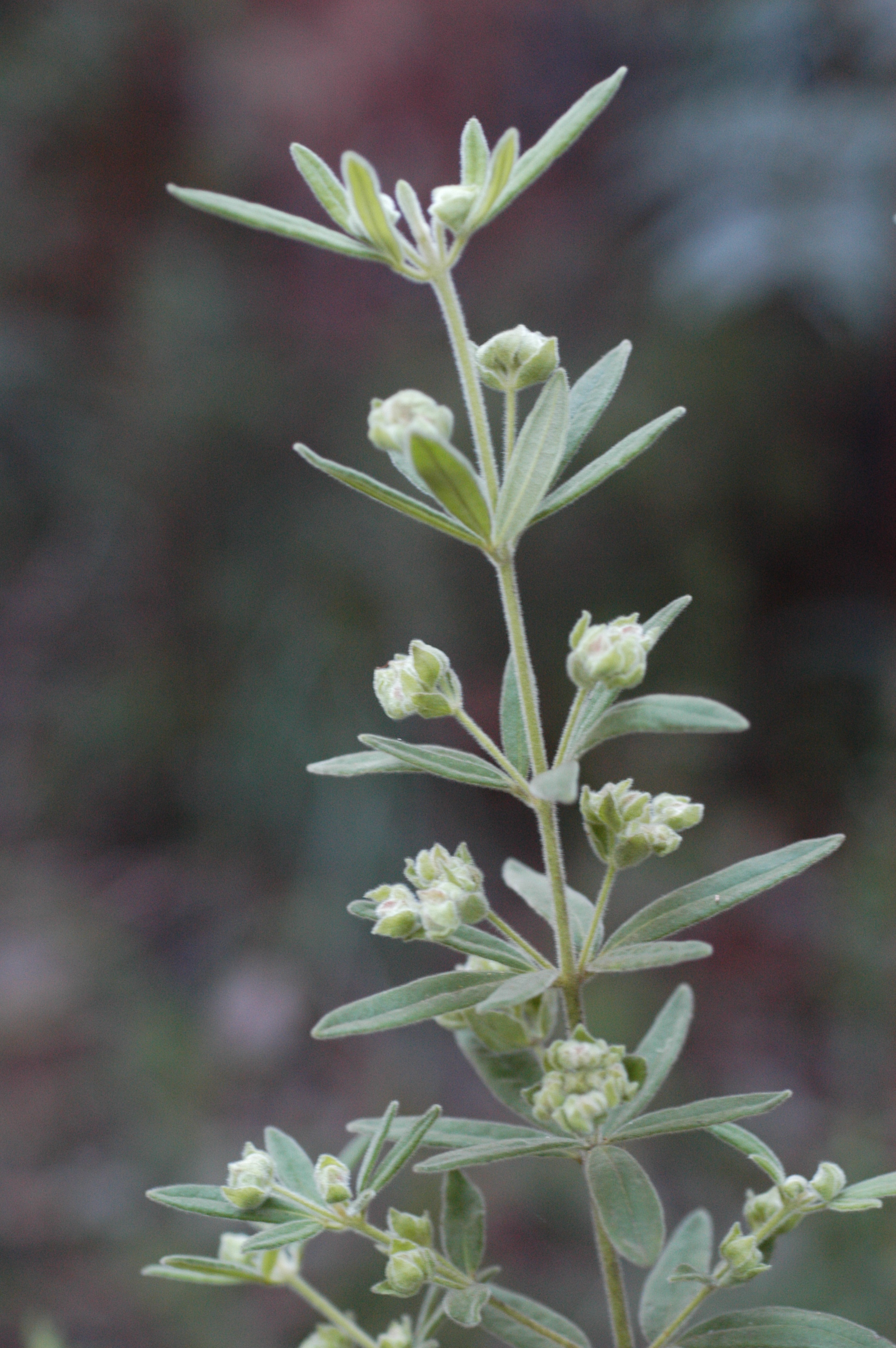
Zieria involucrata in Yengo National Park

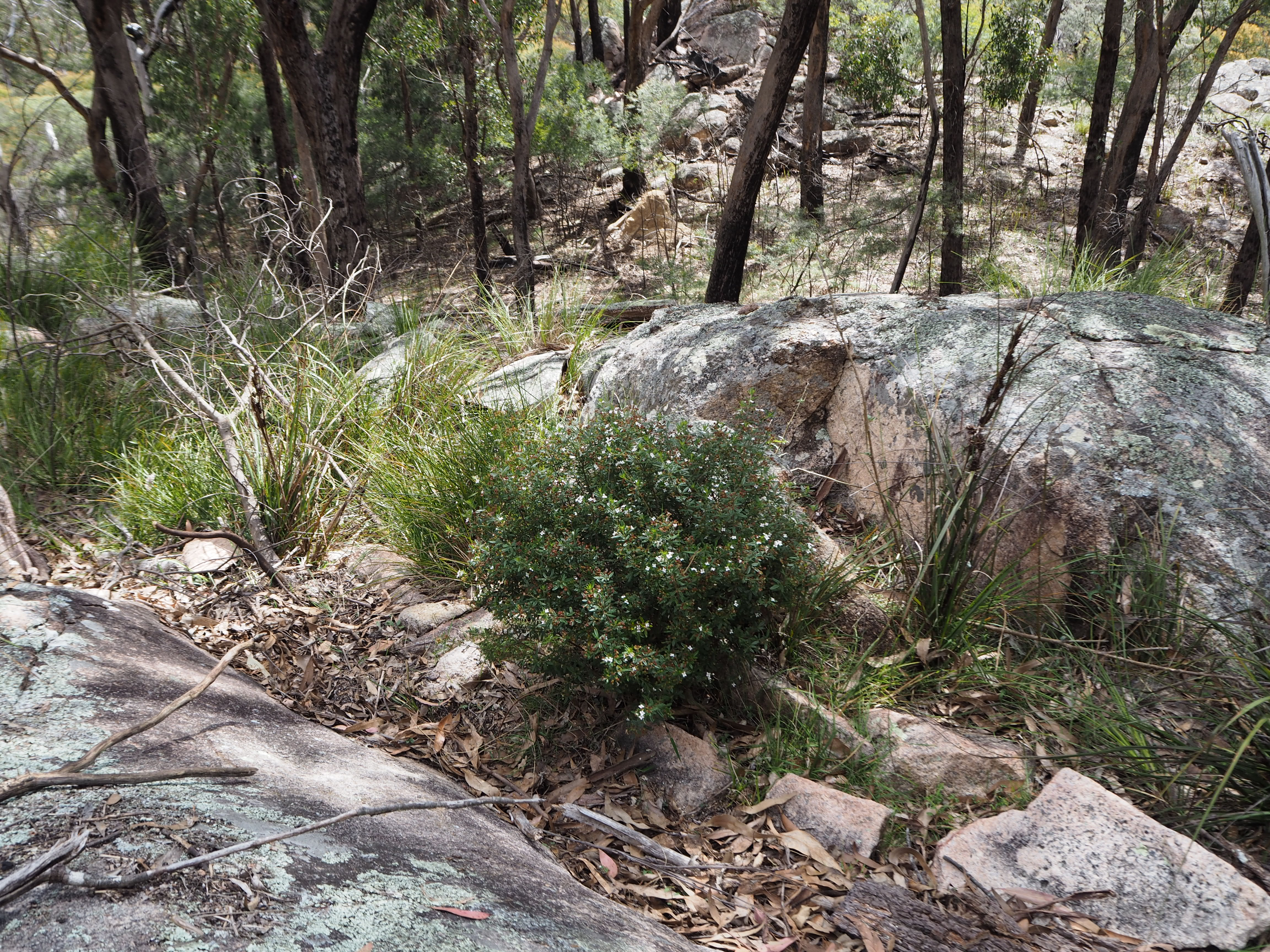
Zieria compacta growing in a nature reserve near Bolivia

Zieria is a genus of plants in the family, Rutaceae. About sixty species have been formally described, all of which are endemic to Australia except for one species which is found in New Caledonia. They occur in all Australian states except Western Australia but the genus is under review and a number of species are yet to be described or the description published. Zierias are similar to the better known genus Boronia but can be distinguished by the number of stamens in the flowers. The name Zieria honours the Polish botanist John Zier.

== Description ==
Plants in the genus Zieria are shrubs or small trees. The leaves are arranged in opposite pairs and are usually compound with three leaflets similar in shape but the middle leaflet slightly larger. The flowers are arranged in groups in the leaf axils and have four fused sepals and four petals alternating with the sepals. There are four stamens (eight in Boronia) and four carpels with their styles fused. The fruit have four lobes, each containing one or two seeds.

== Taxonomy and naming ==
The genus Zieria was first formally described in 1798 by James Edward Smith and the description was published in Transactions of the Linnean Society of London. Smith did not nominate a type species but James Armstrong nominated Zieria smithii as the lectotype. The name Zieria honours "John Zier, a Polish botanist, who assisted F.C. Ehrhart in his collection of plants of the Electorate of Hanover, 1780-83, and afterwards worked in London, where he died in 1793."

In a 2002 study of the genus, James Armstrong placed each species into one of six groups, based on its morphology. The groups are:

- Group A: Z. adenodonta, Z. adenophora, Z. buxijugum, Z. collina, Z. floydii, Z. formosa, Z. furfuracea, Z. granulata, Z. hindii, Z. obcordata, Z. parrisiae, Z. robusta, Z. tuberculata, Z. verrucosa;
- Group B: Z. arborescens, Z. caducibracteata, Z. lasiocaulis, Z. oreocena, Z. southwellii;
- Group C: Z. chevalieri, Z. fraseri, Z. laevigata, Z. laxiflora;
- Group D: Z. montana, Z. prostrata, Z. robertsiorum, Z. smithii;
- Group E: Z. aspalathoides, Z. citriodora, Z. ingramii, Z. minutiflora, Z. obovata, Z. odorifera, Z. pilosa, Z. rimulosa;
- Group F: Z. baeuerlenii, Z. covenyi, Z. cytisoides, Z. involucrata, Z. littoralis, Z. murphyi, Z. veronicea.

In a 2015 study, using a combination of two non-coding chloroplast DNA regions, Internal transcribed spacer and some morphological characters, Cynthia Morton concluded that the genus as presently described is monophyletic. A tentative arrangement of 32 of Armstrong's 42 species was also suggested:

- Group 1: Z. adenodonta, Z. baeuerlenii, Z. collina, Z. cytisoides;
- Group 2: Z. buxijugum, Z. caducibracteata, Z. formosa, Z. granulata, Z. littoralis, Z. parrisiae, Z. tuberculata, Z. verrucosa;
- Group 3: Z. fraseri, Z. odorifera;
- Group 4: Z. prostrata, Z. smithii;
- Group 5: Z. aspalathoides, Z. ingramii;
- Group 6: Z. adenophora, Z. furfuracea, Z. laxiflora;
- Group 7: Z. montana, Z. southwellii;
- Group 8: Z. covenyi, Z. murphyi, Z. odorifera, Z. robusta.

Zieria citriodora, Z. arborescens, Z. minutiflora, Z. obcordata and Z. pilosa were not able to be resolved in this study.

=== Species list ===
As of November 2025, Plants of the World Online accepted the following species:

- Zieria abscondita P.I.Forst.
- Zieria actites Duretto & P.I.Forst.
- Zieria adenodonta (F.Muell.) J.A.Armstr. – Wollumbin zieria
- Zieria adenophora Blakely – Araluen zieria
- Zieria alata Duretto & P.I.Forst.
- Zieria arborescens Sims – stinkwood
- Zieria aspalathoides A.Cunn. ex Benth. – whorled zieria
- Zieria baeuerlenii J.A.Armstr. – Bomaderry zieria
- Zieria bifida Duretto & P.I.Forst.
- Zieria boolbunda Duretto & P.I.Forst. – Box Range zieria
- Zieria buxijugum J.D.Briggs & J.A.Armstr.
- Zieria caducibracteata J.A.Armstr.
- Zieria cephalophila Duretto & P.I.Forst.
- Zieria chevalieri Virot – endemic to New Caledonia
- Zieria citriodora J.A.Armstr. – lemon-scented zieria
- Zieria collina C.T.White – hill zieria
- Zieria compacta C.T.White
- Zieria covenyi J.A.Armstr. – Coveny's zieria
- Zieria cytisoides Sm. – downy zieria
- Zieria distans Duretto & P.I.Forst.
- Zieria eungellaensis Duretto & P.I.Forst.
- Zieria euthadenia (J.A.Armstr.) P.I.Forst.
- Zieria exsul Duretto & P.I.Forst.
- Zieria floydii J.A.Armstr. – Floyd's zieria
- Zieria fordii Duretto
- Zieria formosa J.D.Briggs & J.A.Armstr. – shapely zieria
- Zieria fraseri Hook.
- Zieria furfuracea R.Br. ex Benth.
- Zieria graniticola J.A.Armstr. ex Duretto & P.I.Forst.
- Zieria granulata C.Moore ex Benth. – Illawarra zieria, hill zieria
- Zieria gymnocarpa (J.A.Armstr.) P.I.Forst.
- Zieria hindii J.A.Armstr. – Hind's zieria
- Zieria hydroscopica Duretto & P.I.Forst.
- Zieria inexpectata Duretto & P.I.Forst.
- Zieria ingramii J.A.Armstr – Keith's zieria
- Zieria insularis Duretto & P.I.Forst.
- Zieria involucrata R.Br. ex Benth.
- Zieria laevigata Bonpl. – smooth zieria, twiggy midge bush
- Zieria lasiocaulis – J.A.Armstr. Willi Willi zieria
- Zieria laxiflora (Benth.) Domin – wallum zieria
- Zieria littoralis J.A.Armstr. – dwarf zieria
- Zieria madida Duretto & P.I.Forst
- Zieria minutiflora Domin – twiggy zieria
- Zieria montana J.A.Armstr.
- Zieria murphyi Blakely – Murphy's zieria
- Zieria obcordata A.Cunn. – obcordate-leafed zieria
- Zieria obovata (C.T.White) J.A.Armstr.
- Zieria odorifera J.A.Armstr.
- Zieria oreocena J.A.Armstr. – Grampians zieria
- Zieria parrisiae J.D.Briggs & J.A.Armstr. – Parris' zieria
- Zieria pilosa Rudge – hairy zieria
- Zieria prostrata J.A.Armstr. – headland zieria
- Zieria rimulosa C.T.White
- Zieria robertsiorum J.A.Armstr.
- Zieria robusta Maiden & Betche – round-leafed zieria
- Zieria scopulus Duretto & P.I.Forst.
- Zieria smithii Jacks. – sandfly zieria
- Zieria southwellii J.A.Armstr.
- Zieria tenuis Duretto & P.I.Forst.
- Zieria tuberculata J.A.Armstr.
- Zieria vagans Duretto & P.I.Forst.
- Zieria veronicea (F.Muell.) Benth. – pink zieria
- Zieria verrucosa J.A.Armstr.
- Zieria whitei J.A.Armstr. ex Duretto & P.I.Forst.
- Zieria wilhelminae Duretto

== Distribution ==
Plants in the genus Zieria are endemic to Australia, except for Zieria chevalieri, which is found in New Caledonia. Zierias occur in all Australian states except Western Australia.

== Conservation ==
Zieria parrisiae is listed as "critically endangered" under the Australian Government Environment Protection and Biodiversity Conservation Act 1999. A further eleven are listed as "endangered" and eight as "vulnerable".
