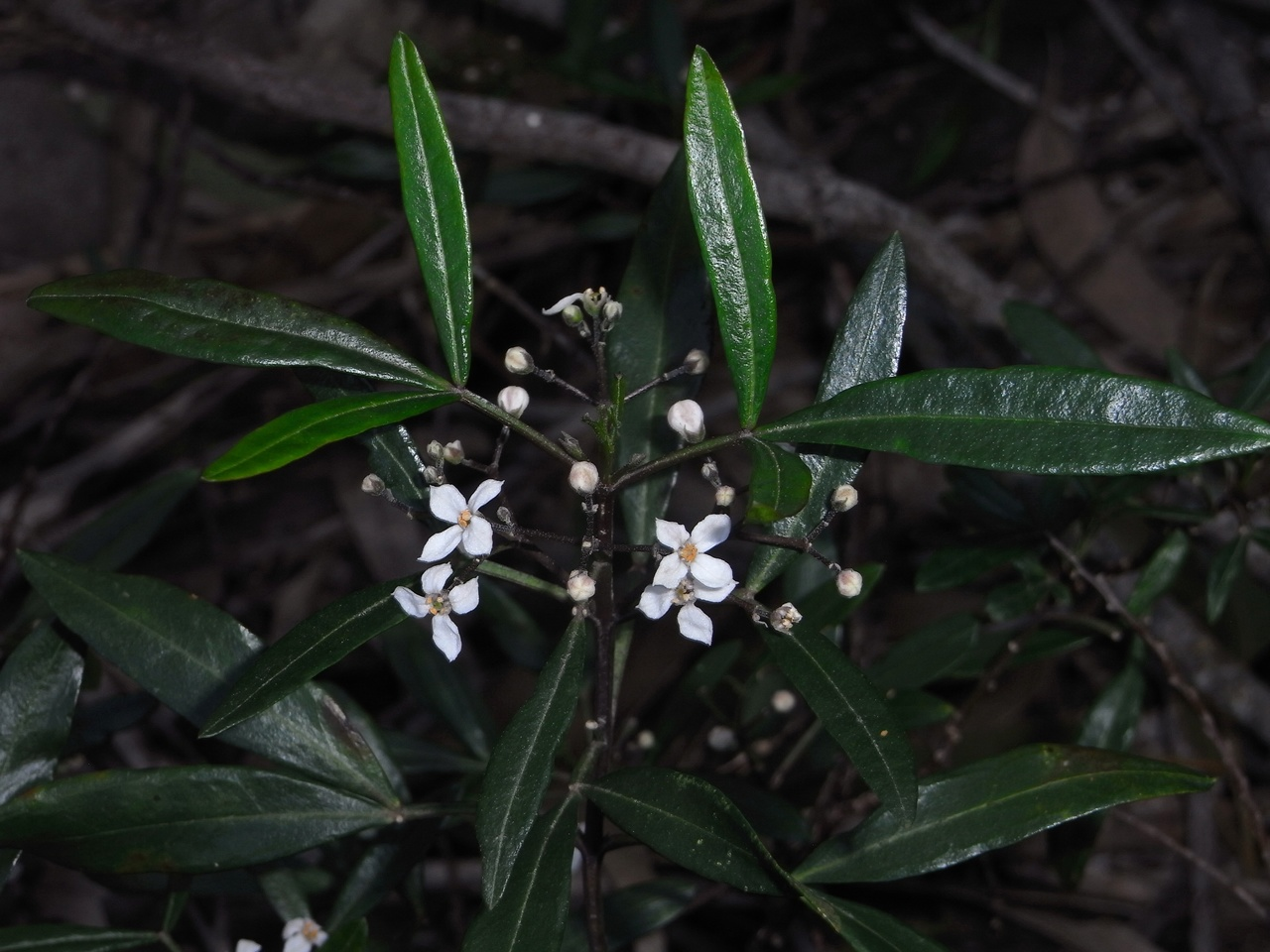
- At the northern end of the Grampians National Park

Scientific classification
- Kingdom: Plantae
- Clade: Tracheophytes
- Clade: Angiosperms
- Clade: Eudicots
- Clade: Rosids
- Order: Sapindales
- Family: Rutaceae
- Genus: Zieria
- Species: Z. oreocena

Binomial name
- Zieria oreocena J.A.Armstr.

= Zieria oreocena =

Grampians zieria

Species of shrub

Zieria oreocena, commonly known as Grampians zieria, is a plant in the citrus family Rutaceae and is endemic to Victoria, Australia. It is a spindly shrub with glabrous, three-part, clover-like leaves and clusters of up to thirty white flowers with four petals and four stamens. It is a rare species, mostly found in the northern Grampians.

== Description ==
Zieria oreocena is a spindly shrub which grows to a height of 3.5 m (10 ft). Its branches are glabrous, dotted with translucent glands and have distinct ridges. The leaves are more or less glabrous and are composed of three lance-shaped leaflets with a petiole 11–36 mm (0.4–1 in) long. The central leaflet is 23–82 mm (0.9–3 in) long, 4–16 mm (0.2–0.6 in) wide. The flowers are arranged in clusters of between 7 and 29 in leaf axils, the clusters shorter than the leaves. The sepals are triangular, 1–2 mm (0.04–0.08 in) long and covered with woolly hairs. The four petals are white, 3.5–6 mm (0.1–0.2 in) long and covered with soft hairs. There are four stamens. Flowering occurs in spring and is followed by fruit which are glabrous capsules containing striped reddish-brown seeds.

== Taxonomy and naming ==
Zieria oreocena was first formally described in 2002 by James Armstrong from a specimen collected near Mount Zero in the Grampians and the description was published in Australian Systematic Botany. The specific epithet is derived from Greek words meaning "a mountain" and "empty", referring to Hollow Mountain, in the Mount Zero area, where the type specimens were collected.

== Distribution and habitat ==
Grampians zieria grows in woodland and shrubland on shallow rocky soils, as well as riparian scrubs on alluvium. It occurs mostly in the northern Grampians and along creek lines in the southernmost Victoria Range.
