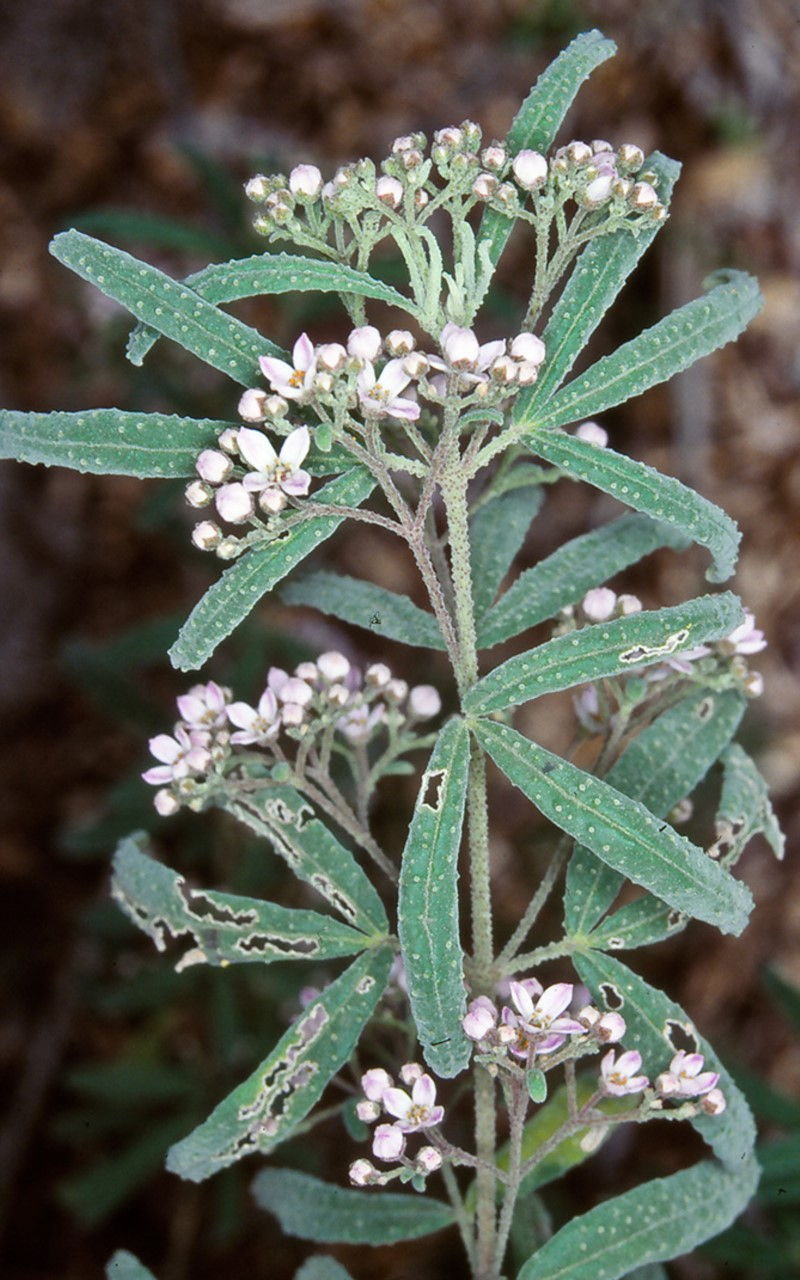
- In the Australian National Botanic Gardens

Conservation status
- Endangered (EPBC Act)

Scientific classification
- Kingdom: Plantae
- Clade: Tracheophytes
- Clade: Angiosperms
- Clade: Eudicots
- Clade: Rosids
- Order: Sapindales
- Family: Rutaceae
- Genus: Zieria
- Species: Z. buxijugum

Binomial name
- Zieria buxijugum J.D.Briggs & J.A.Armstr.

= Zieria buxijugum =

Box Range zieria

Species of flowering plant

Zieria buxijugum, commonly known as the Box Range zieria, is a plant in the citrus family Rutaceae and is endemic to a small area on the south coast of New South Wales. It is a dense, rounded shrub with strongly scented, velvety, clover-like leaves composed of three leaflets. In early spring there are large clusters of small white flowers with four petals near the ends of the branches.

== Description ==
Zieria buxijugum is a dense, rounded shrub which usually grows to a height of 2–3.5 m (7–10 ft) and has warty branches covered with short hairs. The leaves are arranged in opposite pairs and are composed of three leaflets with the central leaflet linear to narrow lance-shaped with the narrower end towards the base, 10–30 mm (0.4–1 in) long and 2–3 mm (0.08–0.1 in) wide with a stalk 2–5 mm (0.08–0.2 in) long. The other two leaflets are similar in shape but slightly shorter. Each leaflet is a dull grey-green, has a velvety covering of hairs and warty blisters and is strongly scented when crushed.

Masses of white flowers about 6–7 mm (0.2–0.3 in) in diameter are arranged in clusters of between 10 and 16 but sometimes as many as 28, in leaf axils. The clusters have a hairy, warty stalk 4–10 mm (0.2–0.4 in) long and are usually longer than the leaves. There are one or two bracts at the base of the cluster. The sepals are triangular, less than 1 mm (0.04 in) long and covered with velvety hairs. The four petals are egg-shaped, about 4 mm (0.2 in) long, 2 mm (0.08 in) wide, densely hairy on the lower side and sparsely hairy on top. The four stamens are tipped with an orange-red anther. Flowering occurs mainly in September and is followed by fruit which is a more or less glabrous capsule.

== Taxonomy and naming ==
Zieria buxijugum was first formally described in 2002 by John Briggs and James Andrew Armstrong from a specimen collected west of Pambula. The description was published in Australian Systematic Botany. The specific epithet (buxijugum) is derived from the Latin words buxus meaning "wood" and jugum meaning "ridge" or "summit of a mountain".

== Distribution and habitat ==
Box Range zieria is only known from a rock outcrop on private property west of Pambula.

== Conservation ==
This zieria is listed as "critically endangered" under the New South Wales Threatened Species Conservation Act and as "Endangered" under the Commonwealth Government Environment Protection and Biodiversity Conservation Act 1999 (EPBC) Act. Since its discovery the population size has fluctuated from 68 when discovered in 1986 to 40 in the mid-1990s to 32 mature individuals in 2001 when wire mesh guards were erected to prevent grazing by swamp wallabies. By 2016, the population had increased to 130. The main threats to the species are grazing by wallabies and future changes in land ownership.
