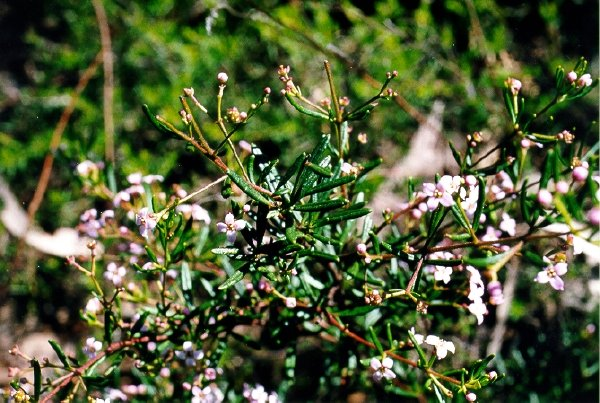

Conservation status
- Endangered (EPBC Act)

Scientific classification
- Kingdom: Plantae
- Clade: Tracheophytes
- Clade: Angiosperms
- Clade: Eudicots
- Clade: Rosids
- Order: Sapindales
- Family: Rutaceae
- Genus: Zieria
- Species: Z. ingramii

Binomial name
- Zieria ingramii J.A.Armstr.

= Zieria ingramii =

Keith's zieria

Species of flowering plant

Zieria ingramii, commonly known as Ingram's Zieria or Keith's zieria, is a plant in the citrus family Rutaceae and is endemic to a small area in central New South Wales. It is a slender, spindly, aromatic shrub with three-part, clover-like leaves and clusters of about seven white to pale pink flowers with four petals and four stamens. The species is only known from two state forests near Dubbo.

== Description ==
Zieria ingramii is a slender, spindly, aromatic shrub which grows to a height of 0.6 m (2 ft). Its branches are ridged but unlike some other zierias, not warty. The leaves are composed of three linear to narrow elliptic leaflets with the central one 9–19 mm (0.4–0.7 in) long, 1–3 mm (0.04–0.1 in) wide and with a petiole 1–2 mm (0.04–0.08 in) long. Both surfaces of the leaflets are the same colour and the edges of the leaflets are rolled under, almost to the mid-vein. The upper surface is more or less glabrous and covered with oil glands while the lower surface is covered with long, soft hairs. The flowers are arranged in clusters of about seven, ranging from three to thirteen in leaf axils, the clusters about the same length as the leaves. The sepals are triangular, about 1.5 mm (0.06 in) long and glabrous. The four petals are white to pale pink, about 3 mm (0.1 in) long with their bases overlapping each other and are hairy on the outer surface and glabrous on the inner one. There are four stamens. Flowering occurs in spring and is followed by fruit which are glabrous, warty, four-chambered capsules containing dull black seeds.

This zieria is similar to Z. aspalathoides but that species has fewer but larger flowers in each group and shorter, warty leaflets.

== Taxonomy and naming ==
Zieria ingramii was first formally described in 2002 by James Armstrong from a specimen collected in the Goonoo State Forest and the description was published in Australian Systematic Botany. Both the specific epithet (ingramii) and the common name honour the botanical collector Keith Ingram.

== Distribution and habitat ==
Keith's zieria is currently only known from Goonoo Forest and Cobbora Forest near Dubbo where it grows in woodland and forest in light, sandy soil. It often occurs with black cypress pine (Callitris endlicheri) and blue-leaved ironbark (Eucalyptus nubila).

== Conservation ==
Zieria ingramii is classified as "endangered" under the Australian Government Environment Protection and Biodiversity Conservation Act 1999 and the Government of New South Wales Threatened Species Conservation Act 1995. Only about 2,000 individual plants are known and the reasons for the species' decline are not well understood although absence of fire may be a contributing factor.
