= Leioproctus goonooensis =

Scientific classification
- Kingdom: Animalia
- Phylum: Arthropoda
- Clade: Pancrustacea
- Class: Insecta
- Order: Hymenoptera
- Family: Colletidae
- Genus: Leioproctus
- Species: L. goonooensis

Binomial name
- Leioproctus goonooensis Batley, 2025

Species of bee

Leioproctus goonooensis, or Leioproctus (Euryglossidia) goonooensis, is a species of bee in the family Colletidae and subfamily Colletinae. It is endemic to Australia. It was described by entomologist Michael Batley in 2025.

== Etymology ==
The specific epithet goonooensis refers to the type locality.

== Description ==
The female body length is 6.9 mm, male body length 5.8 mm. Integumental colouration is mainly black. The hair is white to brown.

== Distribution and habitat ==
The species occurs in south-eastern Australia. The type locality is the Goonoo State Conservation Area, 6 km south-west of Mendooran in the Central West region of New South Wales.

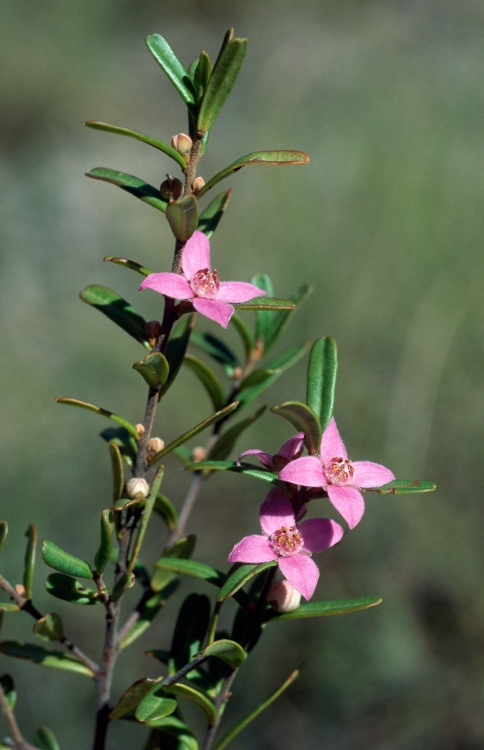
Flowers of Boronia glabra

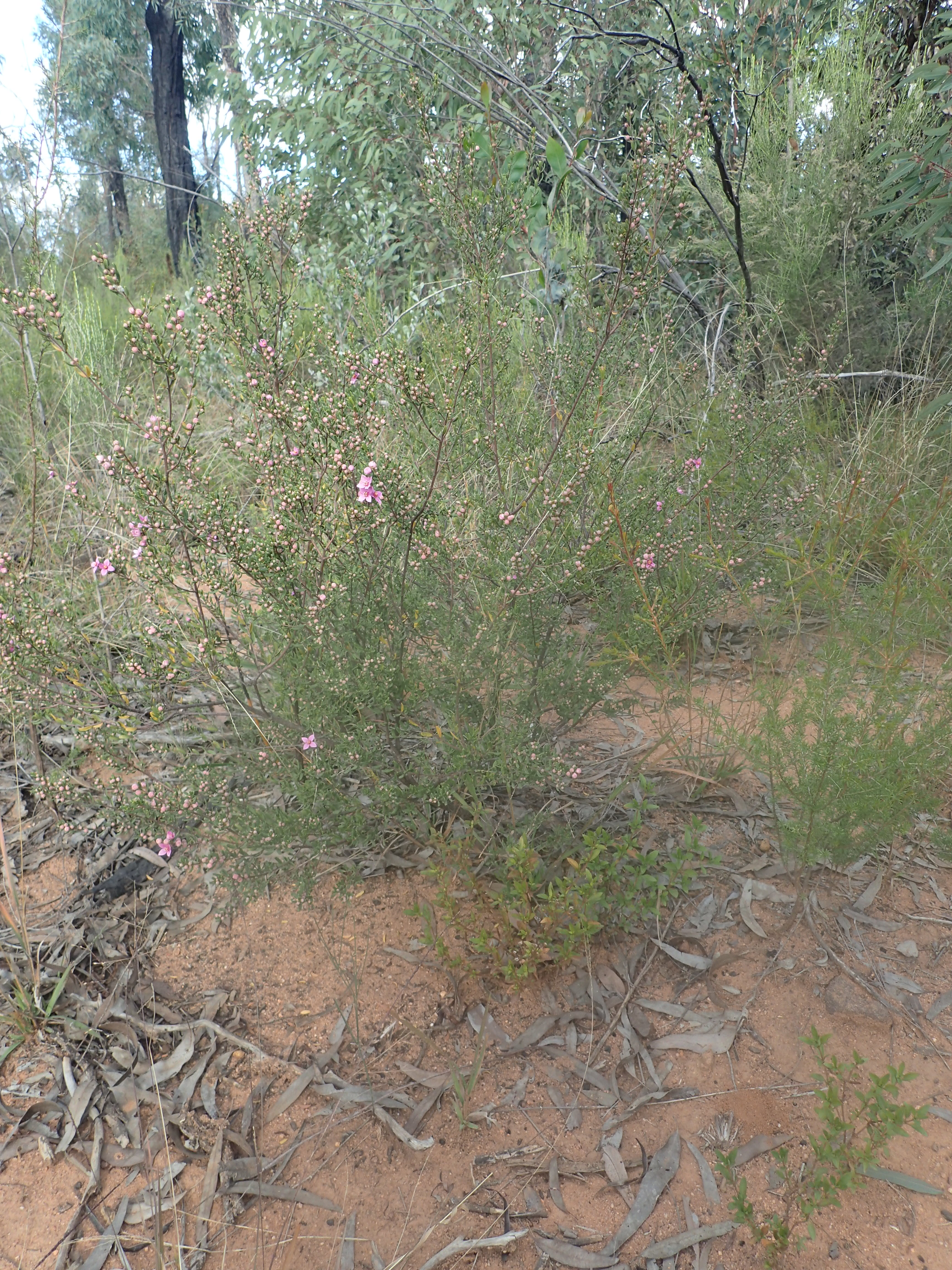
Boronia glabra (sandstone boronia), a forage plant of the bees

== Behaviour ==
The adults are flying mellivores. Flowering plants visited by the bees include Boronia glabra.
