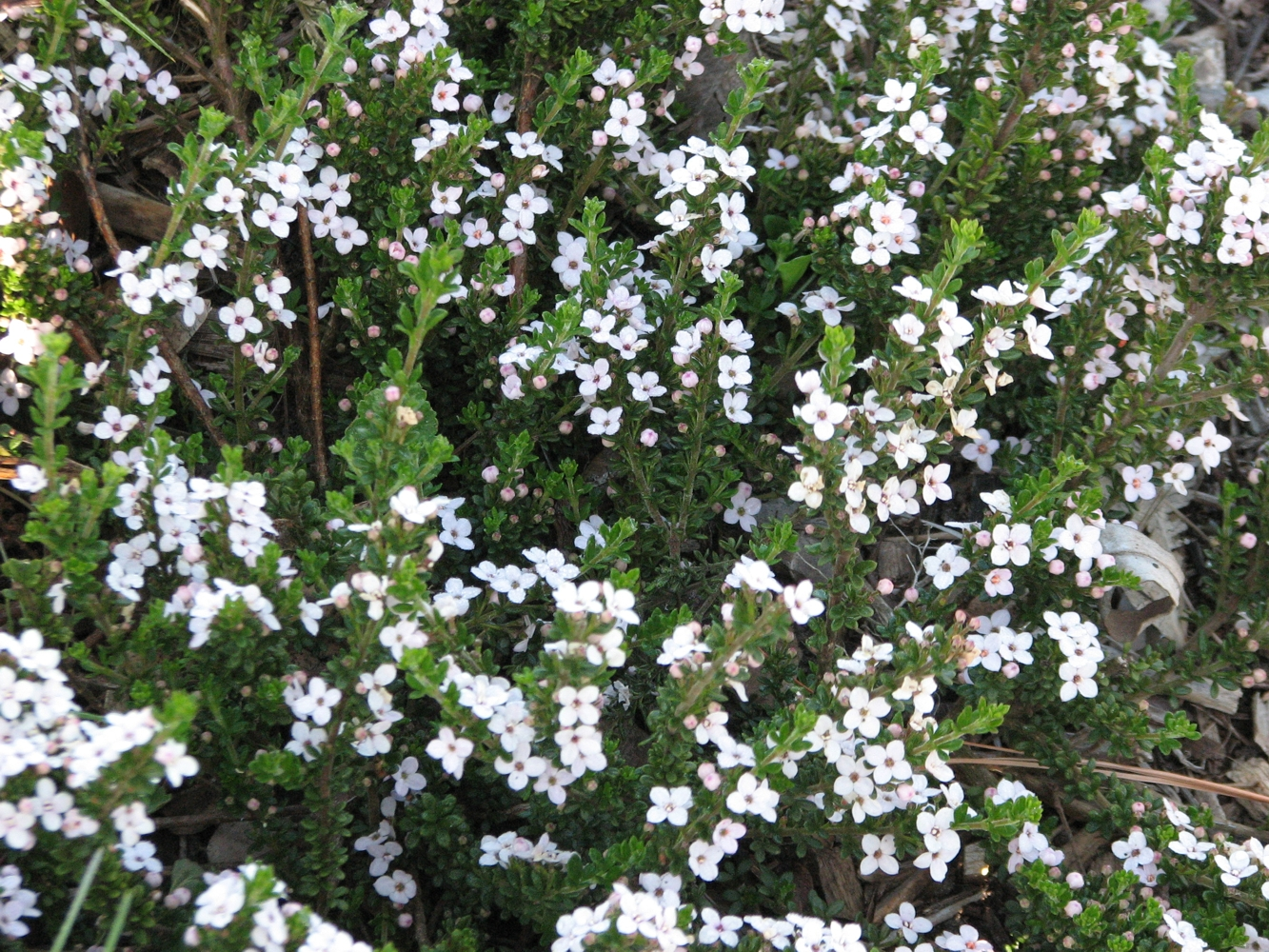
- In the Royal Botanic Gardens, Melbourne

Conservation status
- Vulnerable (EPBC Act)

Scientific classification
- Kingdom: Plantae
- Clade: Tracheophytes
- Clade: Angiosperms
- Clade: Eudicots
- Clade: Rosids
- Order: Sapindales
- Family: Rutaceae
- Genus: Zieria
- Species: Z. citriodora

Binomial name
- Zieria citriodora J.A.Armstr.

Synonyms
- Zieria sp. D (aff. aspalathoides); Zieria sp. 2 (sp. 'B'; Numeralla-Kybean Trig); Zieria citriodora (Coveny 6590) J.A.Armstr. MS

= Zieria citriodora =

Lemon-scented zieria

Species of plant

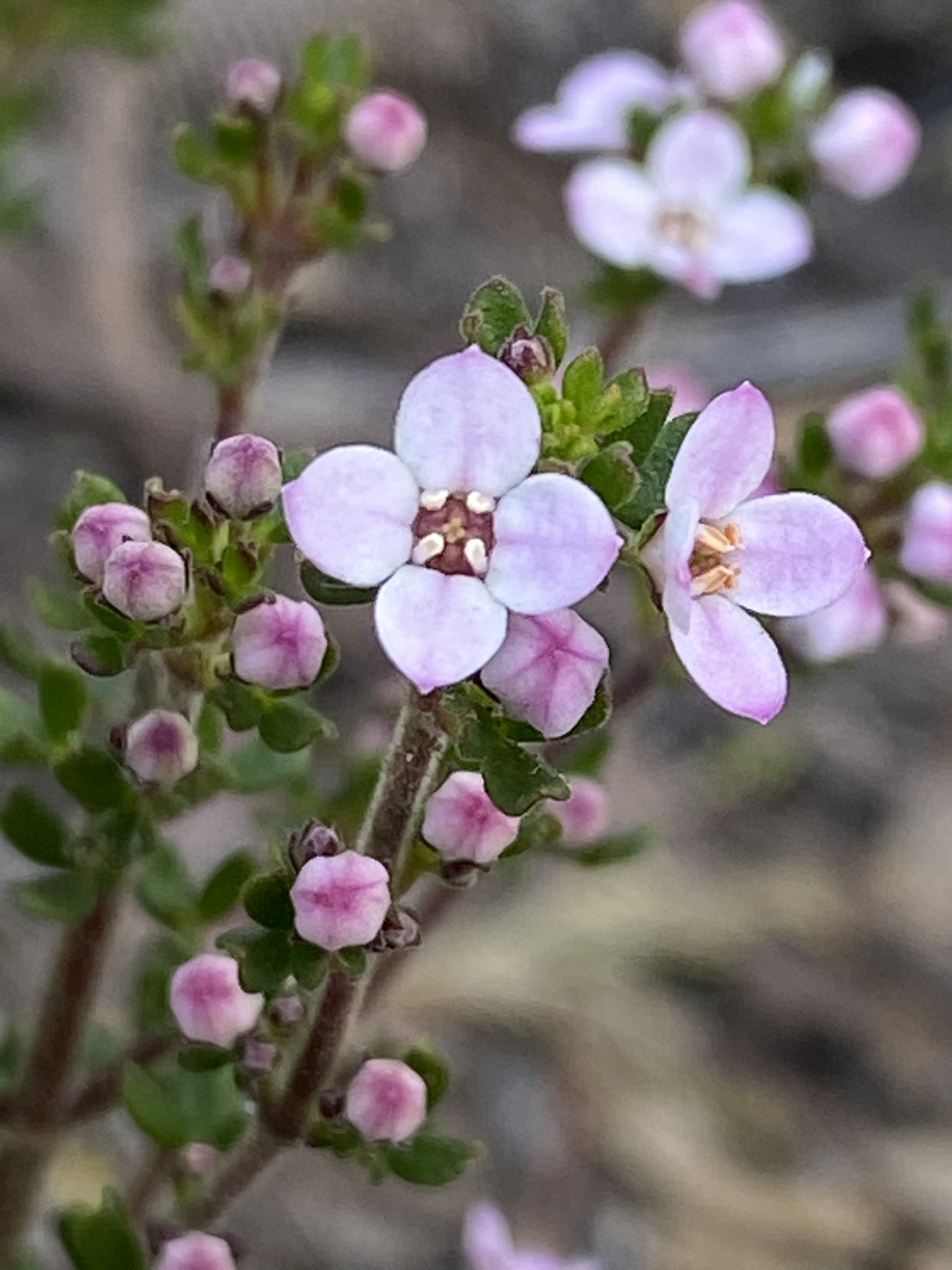
Pink form

Zieria citriodora, commonly known as lemon-scented zieria, is a species of flowering plant in the citrus family Rutaceae and is endemic to a small area near the border between New South Wales and Victoria. It is a small shrub with lemon-scented leaves and small, pale pink or white flowers which appear from late winter to summer.

== Description ==
Zieria citriodora is a low or rounded shrub which grows to 15–20 cm (6–8 in) high and 30 cm (1 ft) wide and which often grows from rhizomes. Its branches are dotted with oil glands and covered with short, soft hairs, often becoming glabrous with age. The leaves are composed of three leaflets with the central one linear or lance-shaped, 4–5 mm (0.16–0.20 in) long and 1.5–2 mm (0.06–0.08 in) wide with a petiole 2–4 mm (0.08–0.2 in) long. Each leaflet is dotted with oil glands, has a covering of short, soft hairs and has its edges more or less rolled under. The leaves are strongly lemon-scented when crushed.

The flowers are arranged singly or in groups of up to three in leaf axils, the groups usually much longer than the leaves. The sepals are triangular, about 1.4 mm (0.06 in) long and hairy. The four petals are white to pale pink, 4–6 mm (0.16–0.24 in) long, overlap at their edges and are covered with tiny, soft hairs. Flowering occurs from late winter to summer and the fruits which follow are hairy and dotted with oil glands.

== Taxonomy and naming ==
Lemon-scented zieria was first formally described in 2002 by James Armstrong from a specimen collected near the village of Numeralla and the description was published in Australian Systematic Botany. The specific epithet (citriodora) is derived from the Latin words citrus meaning "citron-tree" and odora meaning "having a fragrant smell."

== Distribution and habitat ==
Zieria citriodora mostly grows in shallow gravelly or sandy soils on moderately steep slopes in low eucalypt woodland. It is found in scattered populations in New South Wales and Victoria. In New South Wales, there are two populations which are restricted to the Kybeyan Range east of Cooma and in Victoria to four populations in East Gippsland. These populations are all within the South Eastern Highlands biogeographic region.

== Conservation ==
The total population of Z. citriodora in New South Wales is estimated to be less than 600 individual plants including about 150 plants on crown land near Numerella and another of 32 plants on private land near Kybeyan. A count in 2004 of the species in Victoria estimated a population size of about 260 plants, all in the Alpine National Park near Omeo. The main threats to the species are browsing by both native hervibores and domestic stock, pressure from rural residential development and altered fire regines. The species is listed as vulnerable under the Environment Protection and Biodiversity Conservation Act 1999.

== Use in horticulture ==
Lemon-scented zieria is most easily propagated from cuttings and grows best in well-drained, acidic soil. It requires little fertilizer and is usually not affected by pests or disease if grown in well-drained soil. It is frost resistant and tolerates exposed and partly shaded positions.
