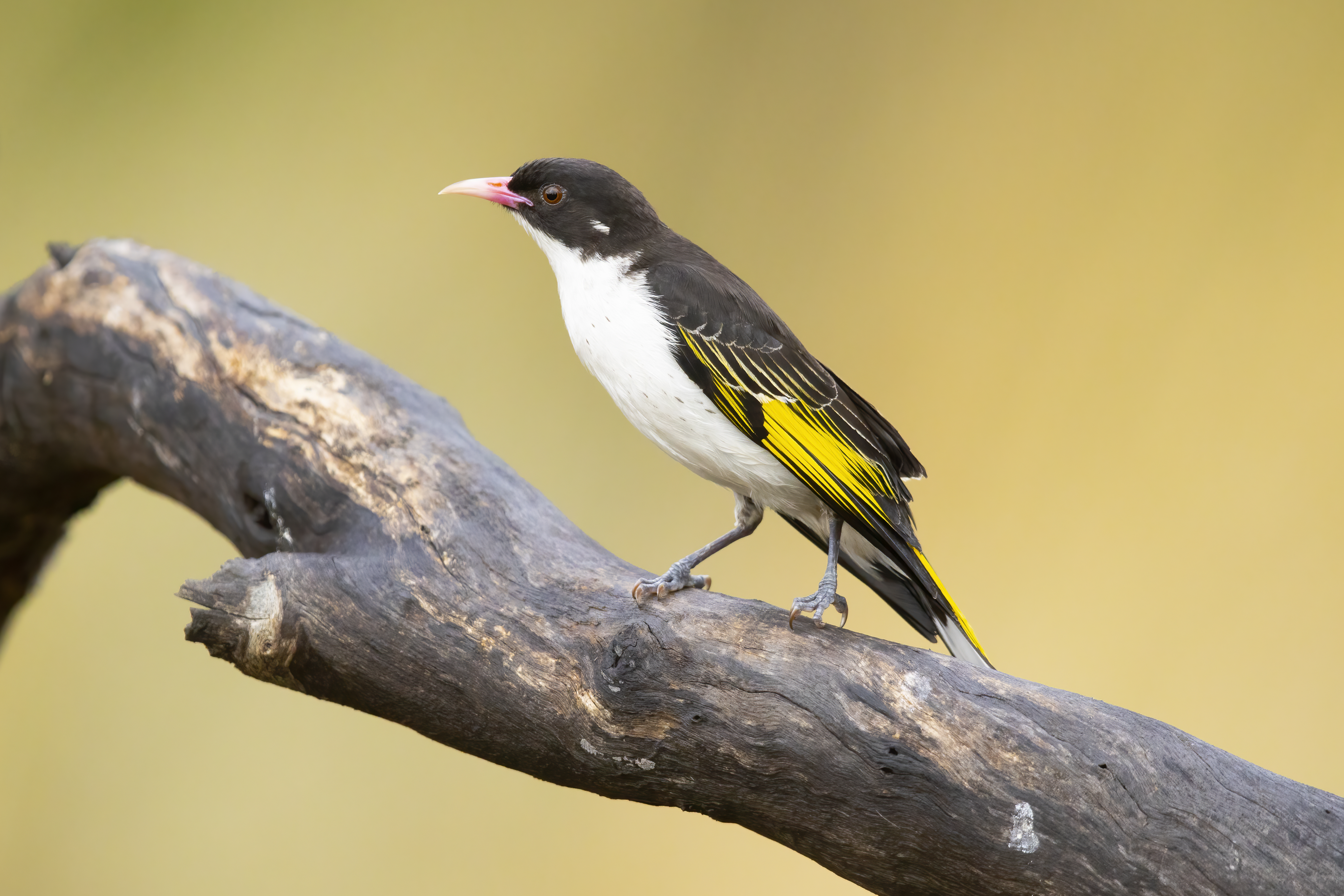

Conservation status
- Least Concern (IUCN 3.1)

Scientific classification
- Kingdom: Animalia
- Phylum: Chordata
- Class: Aves
- Order: Passeriformes
- Family: Meliphagidae
- Genus: Grantiella; Mathews, 1911
- Species: G. picta

Binomial name
- Grantiella picta (Gould, 1838)
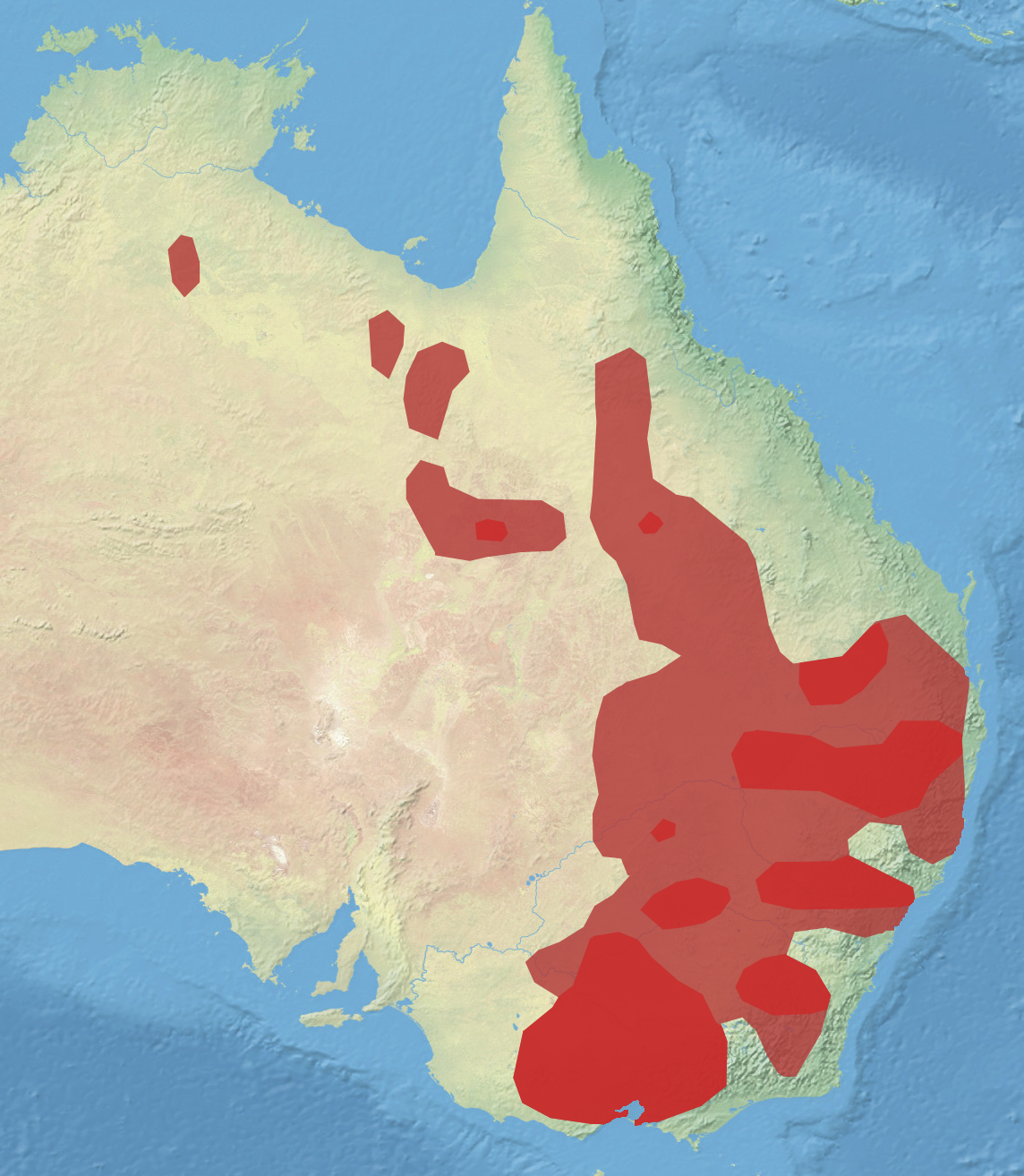
- Distribution of the painted honeyeater Deeper Red Indicates Breeding Range

= Painted honeyeater =

Species of bird

The painted honeyeater (Grantiella picta) is a species of honeyeater in a monotypic genus.

== Taxonomy ==
A member of the family Meliphagidae, Grantiella picta is the sole species under this genus. The painted honeyeater was first described in 1838 by Gould and given the name Entomophila picta, but it was renamed Grantiella picta in 1911 by Mathews.

It took another sixty years from its initial description before details of its eggs, habits, and distribution began to be investigated and recorded. Its genus name is in reference to Robert Grant, a Scottish-born taxidermist and collector, while the species name originates from the Latin word for painted, pictus, and refers to the yellow markings on the feathers of its tail and wings.

DNA sequencing has helped in organising genera within the family Meliphagidae into four main clades, which show relationships between species. However, a shortage in sampling and statistical analysis has led to some branches within the clades being more strongly linked than others.

A study conducted by Driskell and Christidis suggested that Grantiella is in the fourth clade and has associations with Plectorhyncha and Xanthotis. The relationship reported between Grantiella and Plectorhyncha was an unexpected discovery, due to their morphological differences; their similarity in nest-building behaviour was previously not enough to infer that the two species may be closely linked.

Several findings in the study by Driskell and Christidis have since been questioned in a more recent study on the DNA within the family Meliphagidae, but Grantiella picta was not one of the species investigated further.

== Description ==
Weighing around 20-25g, the painted honeyeater is a small bird that is approximately 16 cm in length, with a similar wingspan. Of the total length, the tail averages about 5.5 cm long and the bill 1.3 cm.

The face, crown and upper parts of the body (including the scapulars, nape and rump) on adult male birds are black, with small white spots located on either side of the head. The underside of the body, consisting of the chin, throat, breast and belly, as well as the underside of the tail, is white. Black spots may be present in amongst the white feathers of the flanks, breast and belly.

The edges of black flight feathers and greater primary and secondary coverts are bright yellow, as are those of the tail feathers, which also have white tips. The striking colour contrast in the feathers of the remiges and rectrices is one of the species' most distinctive traits, along with its pink bill, which has a grey tip. Feet and legs are also grey, while the irises of the eyes are reddish-brown .

Females are slightly smaller than the males and are paler in colour, with fewer spots running down the flanks. Juveniles are even paler than the female, appearing more brown than black, with fainter yellow colouring to feathers and with a grey bill rather than the pink seen on adults.

== Distribution and habitat ==
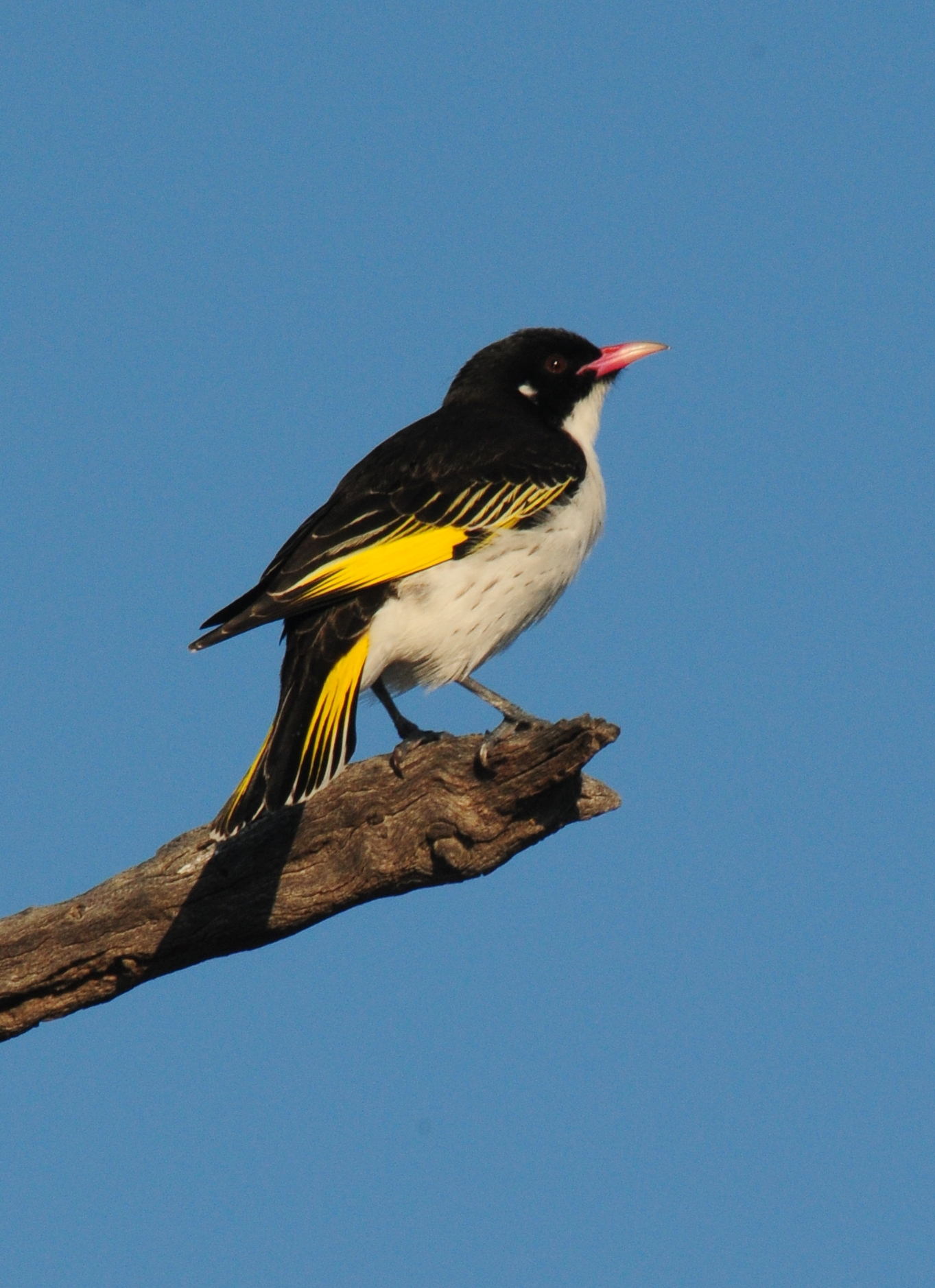
A painted honeyeater. The yellow edges of wing and tail feathers shown clearly.

The painted honeyeater is endemic to Australia and is found across eastern and northern parts of the country. Over spring and summer its distribution stretches from inland central Victoria through scattered parts of much of New South Wales and the ACT and into southern Queensland.

Over winter birds migrate to north Queensland, around Cape York Peninsula, and eastern areas of the Northern Territory. There have also been reports of several sightings in far eastern parts of South Australia.

Found predominantly in woodlands and forests which contain Eucalyptus and Acacia species, their movement is not completely understood but has been connected to the presence of mistletoe and the role of that plant as a food source. Their migration south-north is believed to be as a result of mistletoe berry availability at certain times of the year.

Studies have been conducted which suggest that habitat areas which have undergone less fragmentation and land clearing may see a greater number of painted honeyeaters present. They have also been found to be more abundant in locations where there are a large number of trees present and a high percentage of canopy cover.

The painted honeyeater is a nomadic species that is very elusive. Observing them is rare but when they are seen it is commonly as pairs or individuals, and less frequently as a flock.

=== Important Bird Areas ===
BirdLife International has identified the following sites as being important for painted honeyeater conservation:

New South Wales

- Binya and Cocoparra
- Capertee Valley
- Goonoo
- Pilliga
- South-west Slopes of NSW

Queensland

- Boodjamulla

Victoria

- Warby-Chiltern Box-Ironbark Region

== Behaviour ==
=== Vocalisation ===
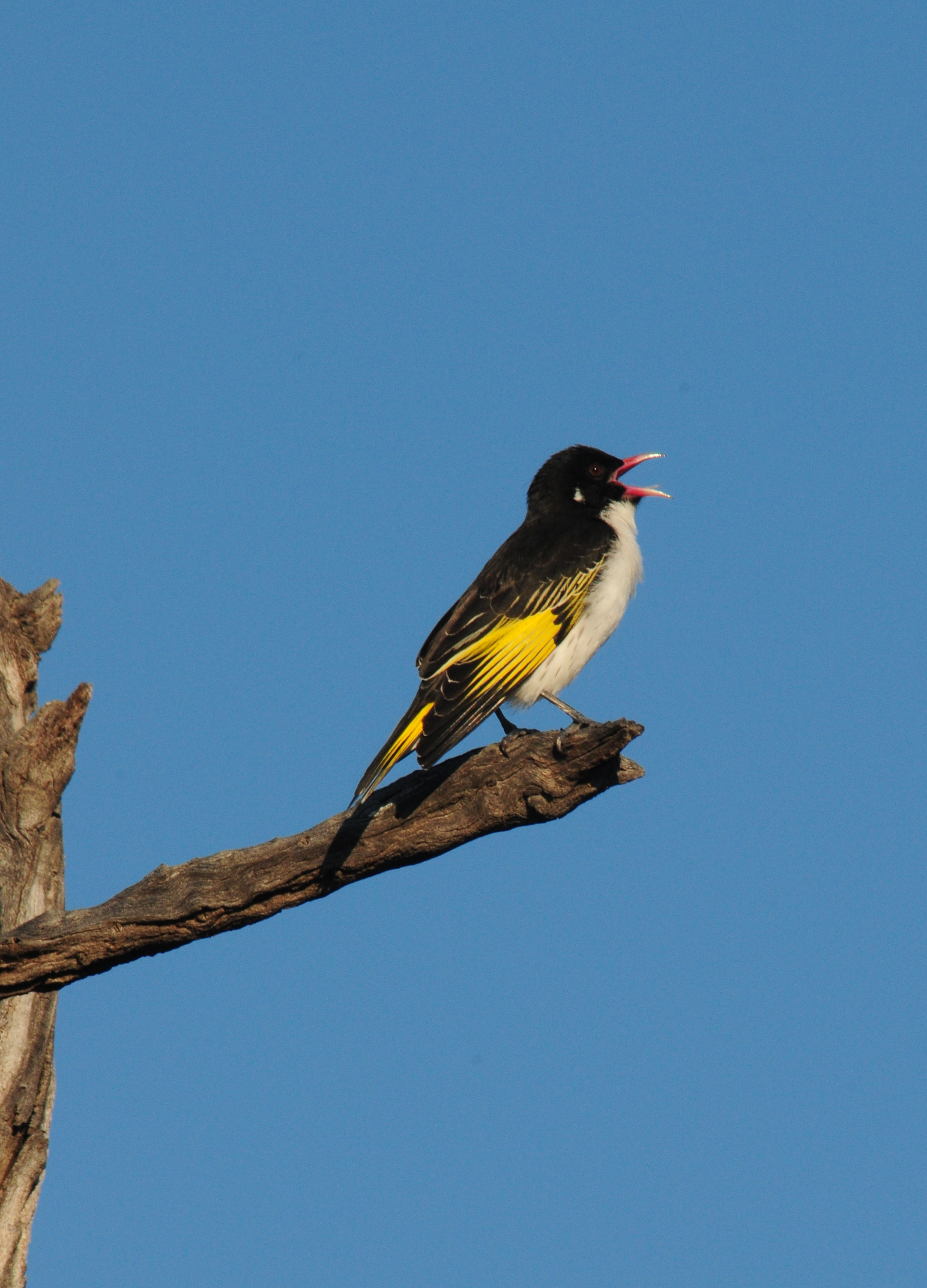
Painted honeyeater singing

Commonly known to give the call "Georgie", which is broken into two notes, for example geor-gie or georg-EEE. This can also be done in reverse. Males can be particularly vocal during courtship and both sexes are known to call when in flight during the breeding season as they leave and approach the nest.

Some birds may quieten down once nesting has begun or give softer calls as they are approached by people, or when they are settling down on the nest. A call sounding like "chur", has been recorded and associated with movement into and out of the nest, possibly signalling relief at returning to the nest.

Under the threat of predation, they also give out alarm calls. Both males and females use differing intensity calls, depending on the situation – a more urgent call is sounded when eggs are being stolen.

=== Breeding ===
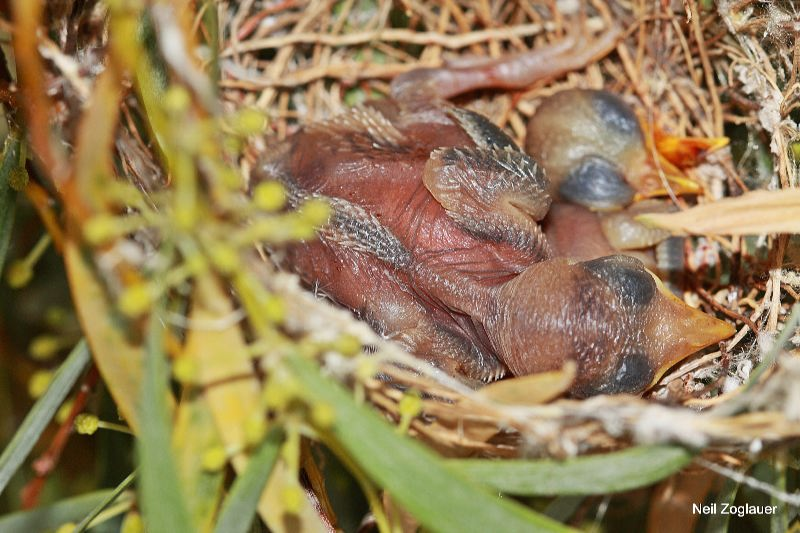
Two painted honeyeater chicks in a nest.

While the breeding patterns of some species of honeyeaters, such as the Regent honeyeater, are based around the nectar of a particular flowering tree, those of the painted honeyeater appear to be centred on the presence of mistletoe berries, particularly those in the genus Amyema.

Although painted honeyeaters build nests in a variety of tree species including Eucalyptus spp. many also favour yarran (Acacia homalophylla) and white cypress-pine (Callitris glaucophylla), both of which are hosts of the hemiparasitic grey mistletoe (Amyema quandang).

The breeding season typically takes place from October through to March, the exact timing determined by the availability of resources, which can in turn be influenced by environmental conditions. Successful reproduction hinges on the availability of food; both the adult and young are dependent on adequate resources for survival.

Male painted honeyeaters generally arrive at the nesting site several weeks before the female, with both sexes leaving around the same time about 5 months later when mistletoe berry numbers begin to decline. Although the fruit is available all year, it is more plentiful over the warmer months, and dwindles as the temperature drops.

Using environmental cues, the timing of nesting is determined by the painted honeyeaters so that they are not arriving at sites as food resources are declining rather than beginning to increase. Coinciding breeding with fruit ripening may also correlate with the preference of many individuals to nest near or amongst mistletoe. It constructs a shallow, flimsy-looking, cup-shaped nest of fine grass and rootlets, bound with spider webs, hanging by the rim from twigs in the outer foliage of a shrub or tree, 3–20 m above the ground.

It is believed the closeness of the fruit to the nesting sites allows the species to put more effort into other activities as a result of not having to go searching for food. However, it has been shown that nests situated within the mistletoe clump can cause higher rates of nest failure and predation, possibly as the result of opportunistic behaviour by other bird species, such as the spiny-cheeked honeyeater.

The fact that this species builds nests at locations where the required resources are readily available has a direct influence on which habitats are chosen. The branching of mistletoes provides structure for the nest to be built in, and the dense foliage helps with concealment. Selecting mistletoe as a site for a nest may also offer a favourable microclimate, one that possibly provides a cooler environment during warmer periods.

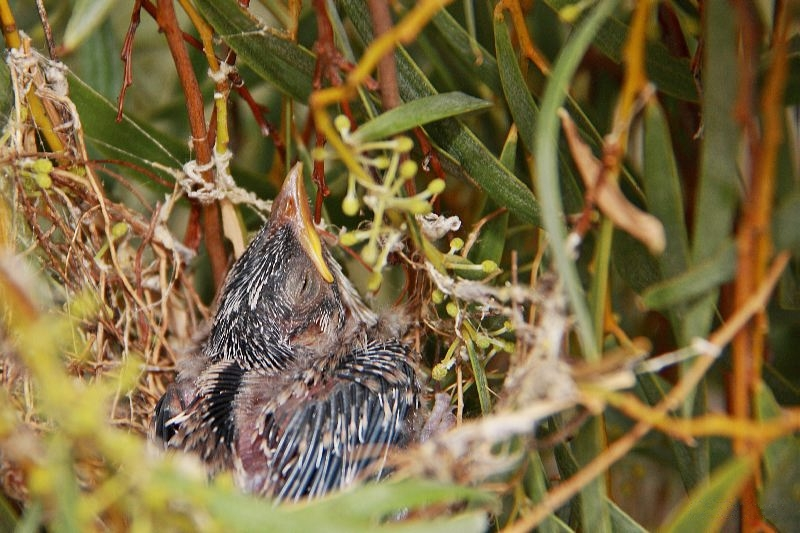
A painted honeyeater chick in a nest.

The life stages from the initiation of a clutch, through to hatching and fledging are a direct response to the availability of the berries as a food source, with fledging occurring just before berry ripening has reached its peak.

While the role of the male in nest construction is limited in some species of honeyeaters, this is not the case with the painted honeyeater. Both male and female painted honeyeaters build and shape the nest, weaving and modifying it in a process that can take weeks. While the female builds, the male sits at the top of the tree, following the female when she leaves in search of nest material. The male may return sooner to add to the nest, but after departing again he will eventually reappear with the female.

The male following the female during nest-building is an attempt to guard her from other interested males, but this behaviour is believed to stop once there are eggs in the nest. The incubation and care of young is also carried out by both males and females with some pairs having more than one attempt at breeding per season

=== Nests and eggs ===
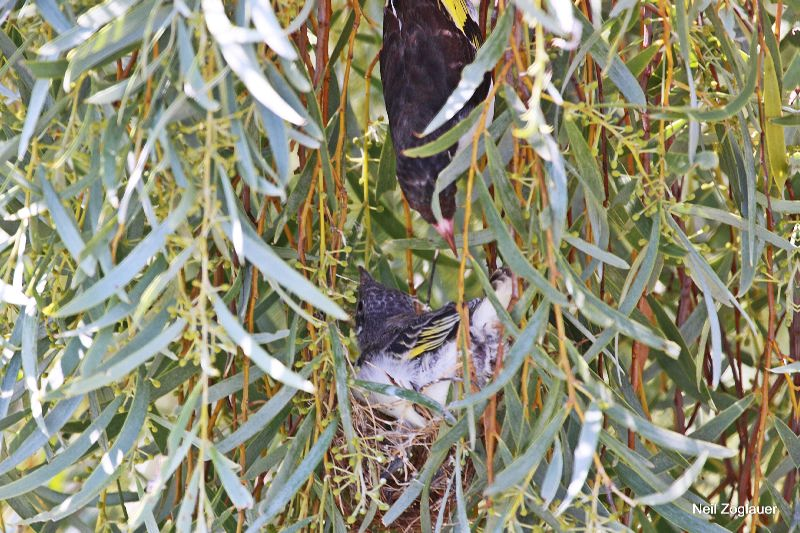
Painted honeyeaters at a nest.

Nests are cup-shaped and made from a variety of materials including fine roots, bark, and grass. Small twigs, flowers and various fibres have also been recorded as contributing to the construction of painted honeyeater nests. Spider web is used to weave the structure together to form a thin nest, which may be see-through in places.

Height of nests in trees can vary from a couple of metres off the ground to over 15 metres high. They are usually built in the drooping foliage of a eucalypt or other suitable tree species, or they are made within the structure of a mistletoe plant.

The clutch typically consists of 2 eggs, but may be either 1 or 3. They are oval, with one end of the egg bigger than the other, and are approximately 2 cm long. Pale pink in colour, they are marked all over with red-brown spots, which become more prominent towards the larger end of the egg.

=== Diet and foraging ===
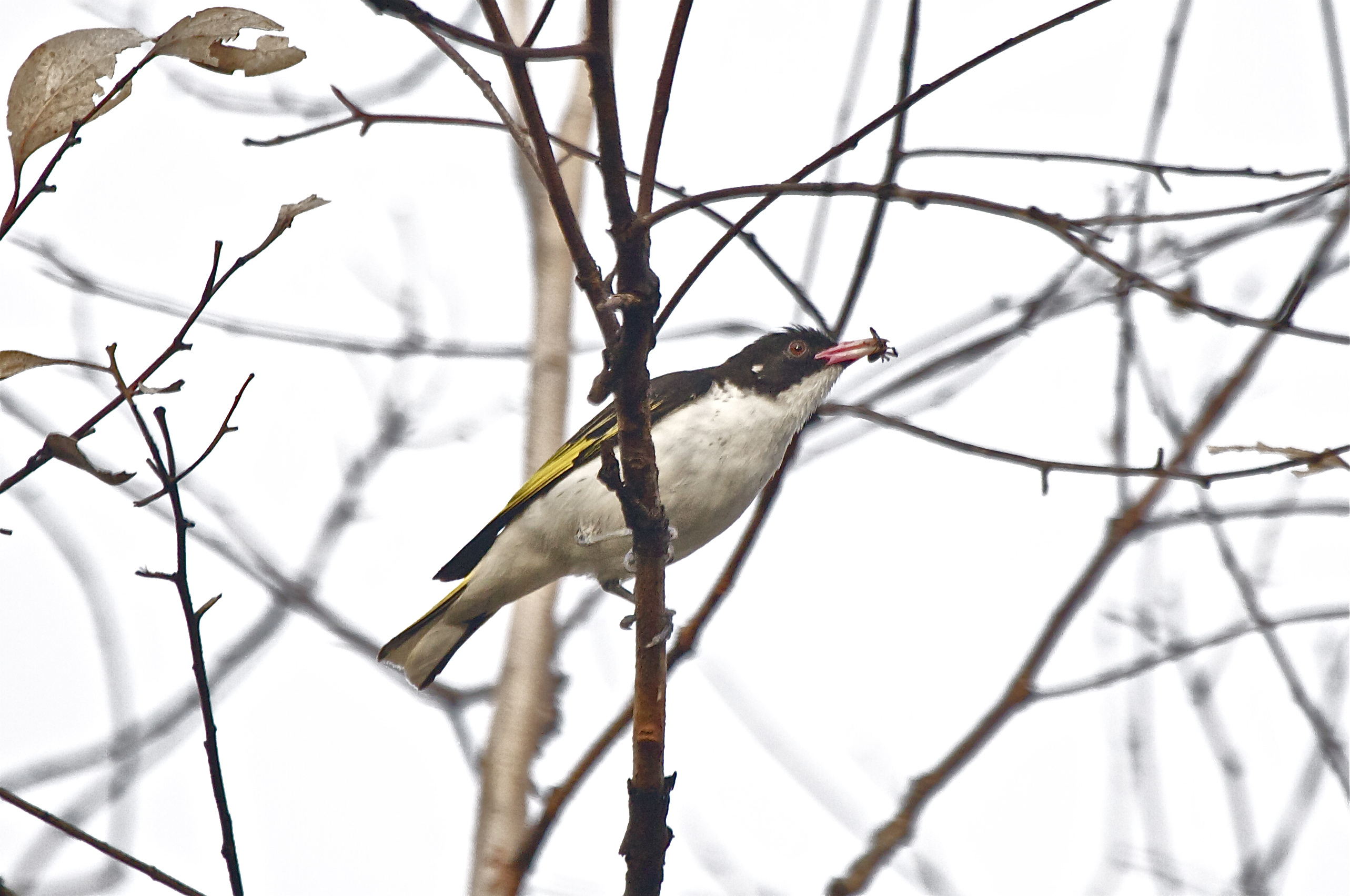
Painted honeyeater feeding on a spider.

Most honeyeaters have a mixed diet, consuming nectar, berries and insects from a range of sources and locations. The painted honeyeater is a frugivore, a dietary specialist dependent on the presence of mistletoe plants and its fruit; and the abundance of this species can usually be determined by the availability of this food source.

At least 5 species of Amyema have been documented as being a food source for the painted honeyeater, for which the birds then assist in dispersal of the mistletoe by excreting the seed. Berries which grow on the grey mistletoe (Amyema quandang) are sources of carbohydrates, protein and water, and account for a significant amount of their diet.

In addition to mistletoe berries, painted honeyeaters consume nectar and insects when berries are unavailable. They may also need insects and nectar to account for a low intake of certain nutrients from the berries. Mistletoe fruit is known to be low in amino acids and protein, so painted honeyeaters must rely on these other food sources to make up the remainder of their dietary requirements.

== Conservation status and threats ==
Painted honeyeaters are threatened by habitat loss. Listed as vulnerable in several states and territories in Australia, fragmentation and land-clearing of areas which provide habitat for the painted honeyeater pose serious threats to the survival of this species.

=== Australia ===
Painted honeyeaters are listed as vulnerable on the Australian Environment Protection and Biodiversity Conservation Act 1999.

=== Victoria ===
- The painted honeyeater is listed as threatened on the Victorian Flora and Fauna Guarantee Act (1988). Under this Act, an Action Statement for the recovery and future management of this species has been prepared.
- On the 2007 advisory list of threatened vertebrate fauna in Victoria, the painted honeyeater is listed as vulnerable.

=== New South Wales ===
- Listed as vulnerable under the Threatened Species Conservation Act 1995.

=== Australian Capital Territory ===
- Listed as vulnerable under The Nature Conservation Act 1980.

=== Queensland ===
- Listed as vulnerable under the Nature Conservation Act 1992.

=== Northern Territory ===
- Listed as vulnerable under the Territory Parks and Wildlife Conservation Act 2000.

The management of fragmented landscapes with a high concentration of mistletoe is vitally important in the conservation of the painted honeyeater, as their breeding success is affected by its abundance. Perceived as a pest in many regards, the mistletoe living within vegetation remnants plays an important role in helping to maintain both species populations and biodiversity. The density of mistletoe has been found to influence species richness, with endangered and declining species benefiting from the food resources this plant has to offer.

Effective maintenance of mistletoe is needed in relation to the management of host species and agricultural practices which influence their abundance, and as a result the habitats of the painted honeyeater. Studies conducted suggest that remnants, such as the Acacia harpophylla remnants located in south Queensland, are important to the painted honeyeater as habitat destruction continues across its distribution range.

The conservation and management of habitats which aim to protect the survival of species such as the regent honeyeater (Xanthomyza phrygia) and swift parrot (Lathamus discolor) may also aid in the conservation of the painted honeyeater. For this reason, consideration must be given to the direct influence mistletoe has in sustaining and providing for species populations, and in the conservation of these species.
