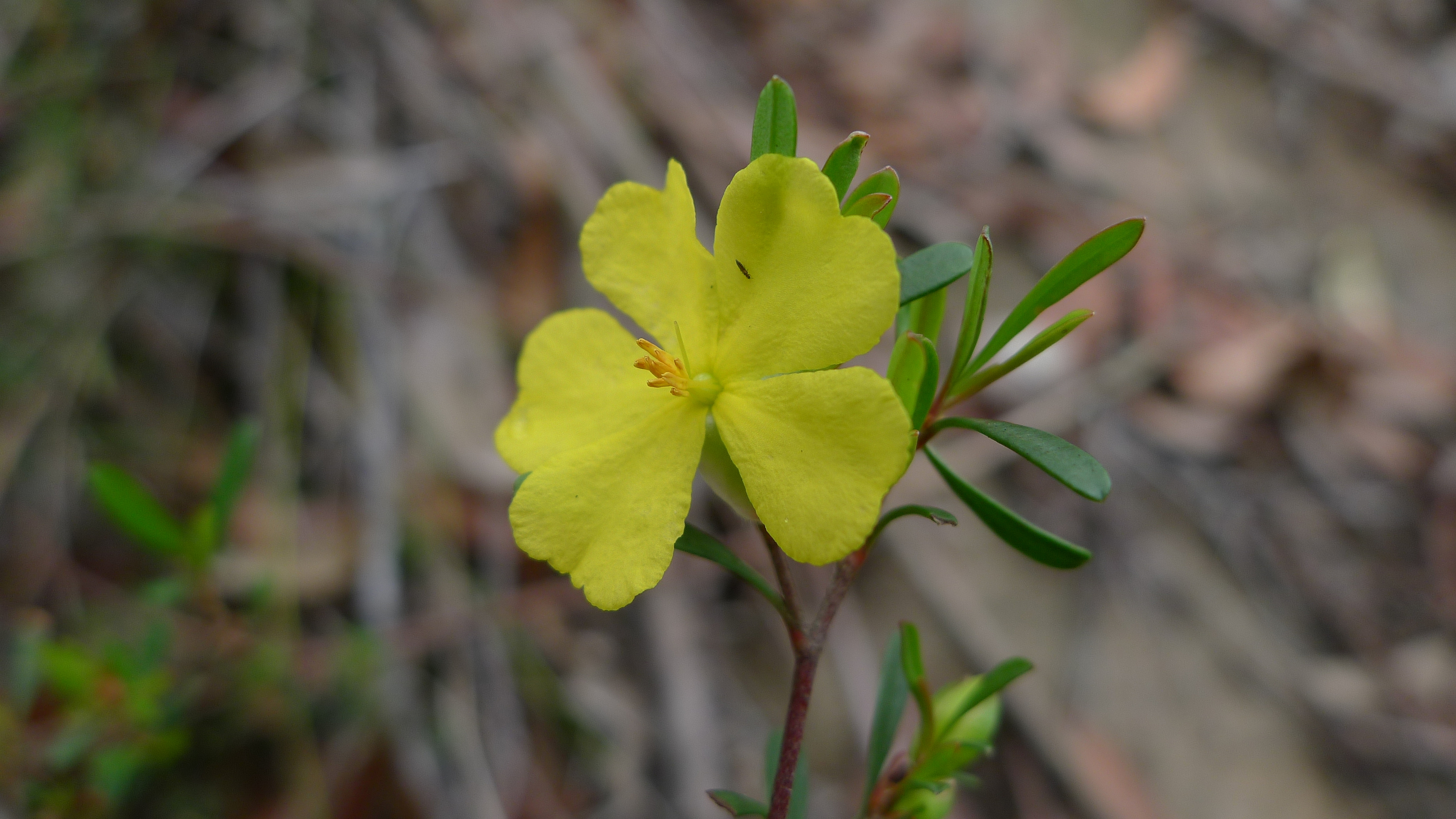
- In the Royal National Park

Scientific classification
- Kingdom: Plantae
- Clade: Tracheophytes
- Clade: Angiosperms
- Clade: Eudicots
- Order: Dilleniales
- Family: Dilleniaceae
- Genus: Hibbertia
- Species: H. monogyna

Binomial name
- Hibbertia monogyna R.Br. ex DC.

= Hibbertia monogyna =

Species of flowering plant

Hibbertia monogyna is a species of flowering plant in the family Dilleniaceae and is endemic to south-eastern Australia. It is an erect, mostly glabrous shrub with linear to wedge-shaped or spatula-shaped leaves and yellow flowers with ten to twelve stamens arranged around a single glabrous carpel.

== Description ==
Hibbertia monogyna is an erect shrub that typically grows to a height of up to 60 cm (24 in) and is more or less glabrous. The leaves are linear to wedge-shaped or spatula-shaped, 5–12 mm (0.20–0.47 in) long, 2.5–5 mm (0.098–0.197 in) wide and sessile. The edges of the leaves curve downwards and there are sometimes teeth near the tip. The flowers are arranged on the ends of short side shoots and are sessile with a linear to lance-shaped bract about 1.5 mm (0.059 in) long at the base. The sepals are 4–6 mm (0.16–0.24 in) long, the lobes of unequal lengths and the petals are yellow, egg-shaped with the narrower end towards the base, 4–6 mm (0.16–0.24 in) long. There are ten to twelve stamens arranged around the single glabrous carpel. Flowering occurs in September and October.

== Taxonomy ==
Hibbertia monogyna was first formally described in 1817 by Augustin Pyramus de Candolle in his Regni Vegetabilis Systema Naturale from an unpublished description by Robert Brown.

== Distribution and habitat ==
This hibbertia grows in forest on hillsides south from the Goonoo Important Bird Area near Dubbo to the far north-east corner of Victoria.
