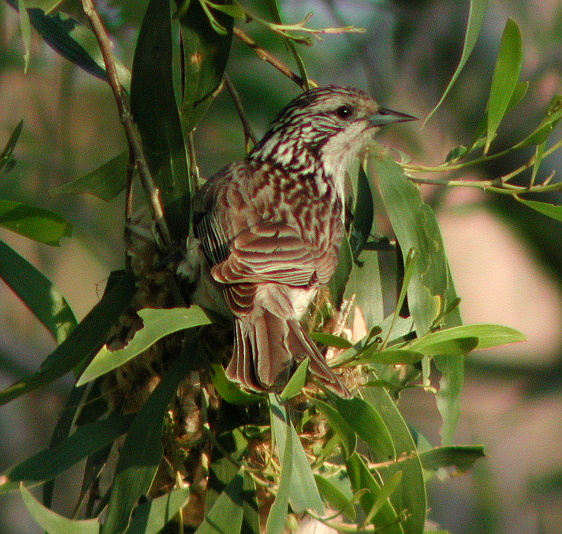

Conservation status
- Least Concern (IUCN 3.1)

Scientific classification
- Kingdom: Animalia
- Phylum: Chordata
- Class: Aves
- Order: Passeriformes
- Family: Meliphagidae
- Genus: Plectorhyncha; Gould, 1838
- Species: P. lanceolata

Binomial name
- Plectorhyncha lanceolata Gould, 1838
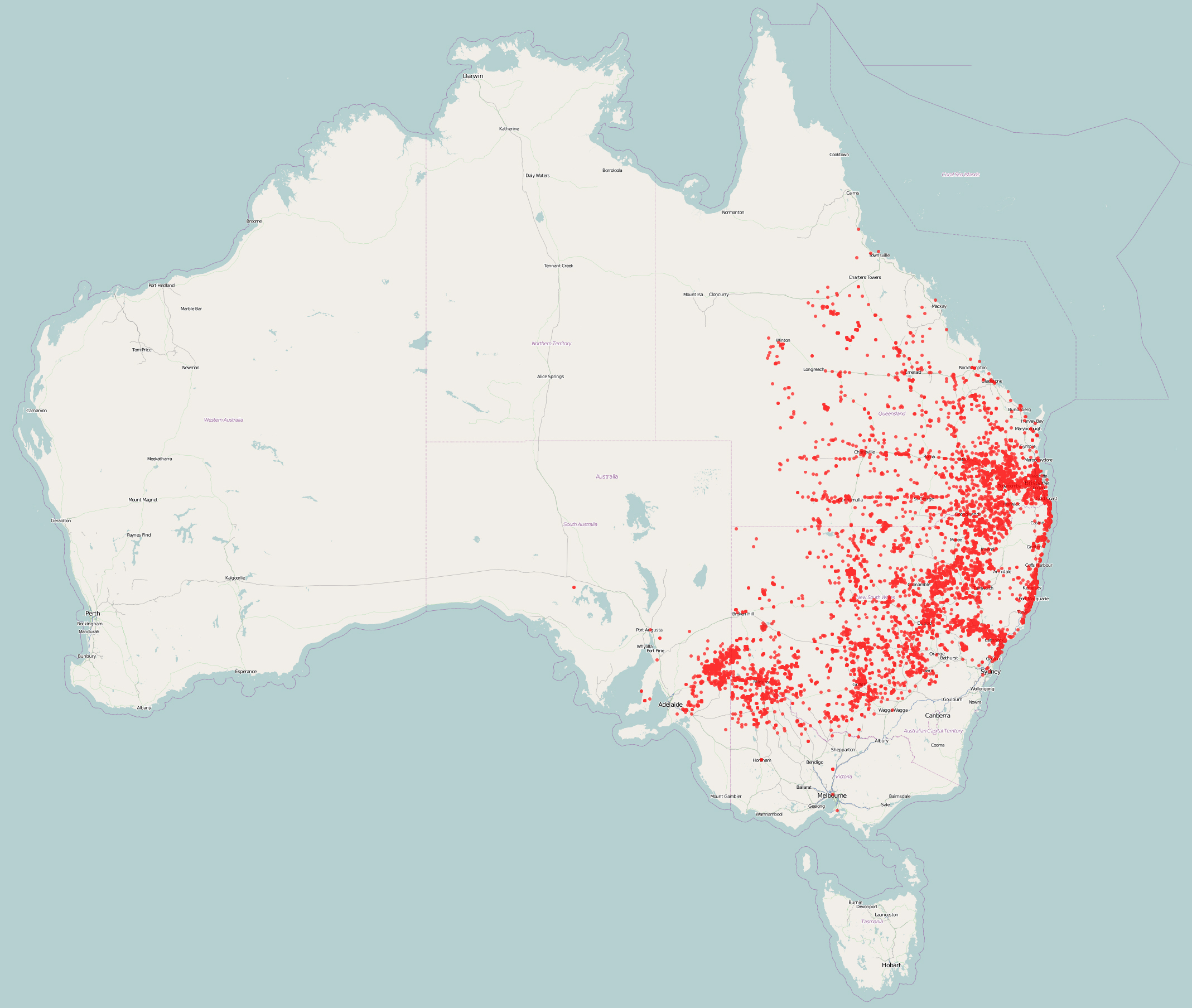
- The distribution of the striped honeyeater Data from The Atlas of Living Australia

= Striped honeyeater =

Species of bird

The striped honeyeater (Plectorhyncha lanceolata) is a passerine bird of the honeyeater family, Meliphagidae, found in Australia. It is a medium-sized honeyeater, about 23 cm (9.1 in) in length. Both sexes are a light greyish brown with dark brown centres to the feathers, which give the appearance of stripes. The stripes are particularly distinct on the head and back of the neck. While it is found mainly in inland eastern Australia where it inhabits the drier open forest, it is also found in coastal swamp forest from southeast Queensland to the central coast of New South Wales.

Although a honeyeater, the striped honeyeater relies on insects as its major food source, and its bill has been adapted to an insect diet. When not breeding it has been recorded feeding and travelling in small groups, but it nests singly, laying around three eggs in a deep cup-shaped nest suspended from the end of drooping branches. It is widely distributed and common within its range, thus the population is listed as being of least concern for conservation by the IUCN.

== Taxonomy ==
The striped honeyeater was first described by English ornithologist and bird artist John Gould in A Synopsis of the Birds of Australia and the Adjacent Islands, published in 1838. It is a member of the family Meliphagidae, the honeyeaters, and the sole member of the monotypic genus Plectorhyncha. Molecular studies indicate that this genus is closely allied to the monotypic genus Grantiella, though dissimilar in appearance. The painted honeyeater (Grantiella picta) and the striped honeyeater are part of a subclade that includes also Philemon and Xanthotis.

The generic name Plectorhyncha is derived from the Ancient Greek plēktron 'spear-point' and rhynkhos 'bill' and refers to the fine-pointed bill. The species name lanceolata comes from the Latin for 'lance-shaped' in reference to the long, pointed feathers on the throat and breast. The bird is also referred to as the lanceolated honeyeater.

Honeyeaters are related to the Pardalotidae (pardalotes), Acanthizidae (Australian warblers, scrubwrens, thornbills, etc.), and the Maluridae (Australian fairy-wrens) in the large superfamily Meliphagoidea.

== Description ==
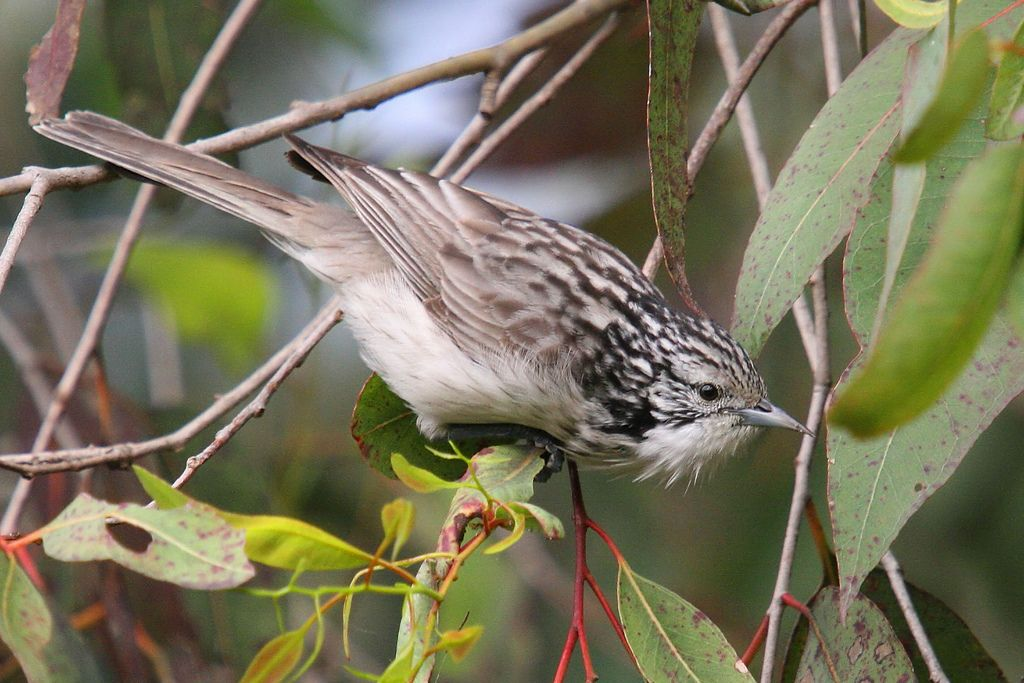
Gleaning in a eucalypt

The striped honeyeater is a medium-sized honeyeater with a body length of 22–25 cm (8.7–9.8 in), a wingspan of 28–36 cm (11–14 in), and an average weight of 40 g (1.4 oz).

The upper parts are generally light greyish brown with dark brown centres to the feathers, giving the appearance of stripes. These stripes are marked on the head and nape, less distinct on the rump and almost absent from the upper tail coverts. The underparts are whitish with faint streaks on the belly. The feathers of the upper breast and throat are long and pointed, giving the head a spiky appearance. The wing and tail are both moderately long with rounded tips. The bill is short, with a sharp pointed appearance, dark blue-grey grading to a grey-black at the tip and around the nostrils. Legs and feet are blue-grey with black claws. The bare skin around the eye is dark brown and the iris a dark black-brown.

Males and females are similar in appearance. Juvenile birds are slightly browner than the adults, with buff or brown edges to the feathers of the wings and back. Juveniles have a duller, less streaked appearance than adults. Juveniles moult into adult plumage at around one year old. There is no seasonal difference in the plumage of breeding birds.

The striped honeyeater's song is described as a chirp, chirp, cherry, cherry, its contact call as a sharp chewee, and its alarm call as a shrill, whistling note.

== Distribution and habitat ==
This species is found mainly in eastern Australia, predominantly inland. It inhabits the drier open forests, such as mallee and mulga, but also heathland and mangroves on the coast. An observer in 1923 was surprised to find a small number of striped honeyeaters nesting at Forster on the New South Wales mid-north coast, saying "it is a remarkable fact for this bird to leave its proper habitat so far inland, to come to the coast". However, the range has expanded, and contemporary accounts give its distribution as eastern Australia from central and southeast Queensland extending inland to southeast South Australia, and along the coast south to the Tuggerah Lakes, New South Wales. Small irruptions associated with weather patterns and habitat changes have been recorded in areas outside its usual range, including the Grampians and the Adelaide Plains.

It occurs in a wide variety of habitats, including riparian woodlands such as river red gum, bimble box and black box with an understory of lignum or saltbush; mallee woodland, especially where mixed with thickets of broombush or emu bush; woodlands of native pine growing on sand ridges; and semi-arid scrubland dominated by Acacia including lancewood. On the coast, the striped honeyeater is found in swamp forests of paperbark and Casuarina, and in developed areas containing native and exotic trees and shrubs such as caravan parks, reserves, gardens, and farms and orchards.

== Behaviour ==
=== Feeding ===
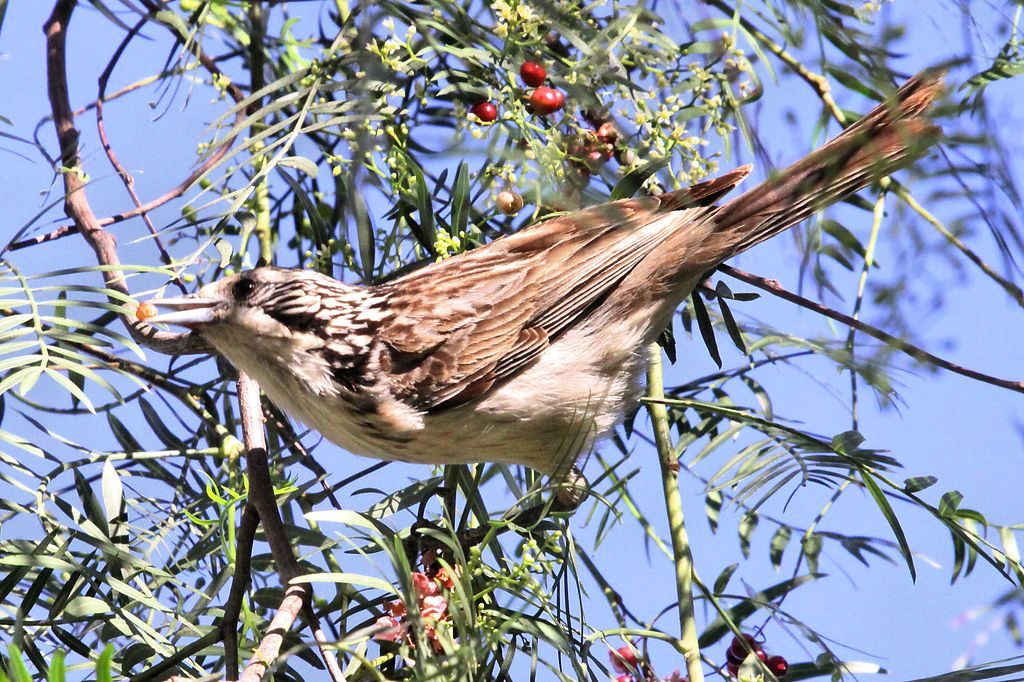
Feeding on berries

Although a honeyeater in origin, the striped honeyeater's food source is primarily insects, and its diet includes seeds and fruits as well as nectar. Its bill has evolved to a short, straight, sharply pointed shape more suited to probing crevices for insects, than to probing flower tubes. It has the honeyeater's brush tongue and takes nectar from shallow flowers such as eucalypt blossoms.

It is arboreal, mostly feeding amongst the foliage in the canopy of trees. Most food is obtained from the leaves, and less often from the bark or flowers and fruit. The major foraging methods are gleaning from leaves and dead branches, probing under loose bark and in crevices, probing woody fruits of Black Oak, probing flowers of Yorrell (Eucalyptus gracilis) and sallying for insects. The striped honeyeater occasionally hangs upside-down to extract insects.

=== Social behaviour ===
The striped honeyeater has most often been observed singly or in twos, and occasionally in small flocks. When not breeding it has been recorded feeding in loose mobile groups, drinking in mixed groups with miners, and travelling in small groups. It engages in a high level of social activity, including perching closely and allopreening, and when feeding in groups chasing, calling and scolding. The non-breeding striped honeyeater is vocal, calling while feeding and perching, though only occasionally calling in flight. It has been recorded engaged in a display of wing-raising and calling, and performing duets or call-and-response song.

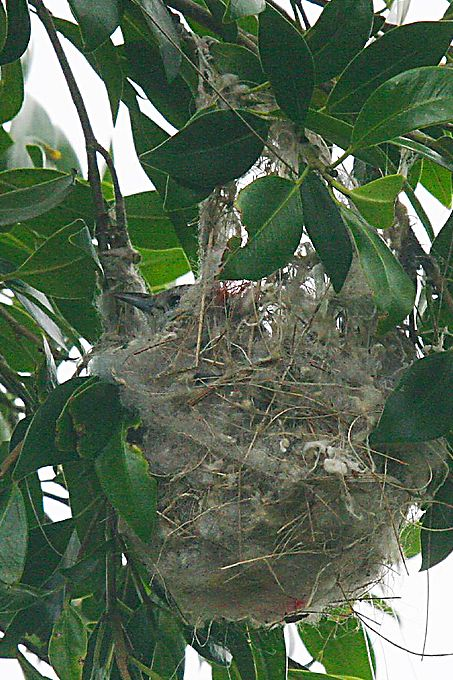
Sitting on the suspended nest

While the striped honeyeater aggressively defends its nest by dive-bombing people and animals who come too close, and has been observed singing from display perches, it is not known to be territorial. It often feeds near other species of honeyeater and no inter-species aggression has been noted.

=== Breeding ===
The striped honeyeater breeds throughout its distribution range, usually as simple pairs, with both sexes building the nest, incubating and feeding the young. However, cooperative breeding has been observed, with a third adult bird involved in feeding nestlings. It nests solitarily, and pairs use the same or adjoining trees for nesting over two or more seasons.

The breeding season is from August to January, though dependent on local conditions. The nest site is usually in the drooping foliage of a tall shrub or low tree, such as Casuarina, Melaleuca, Acacia, and mallee eucalypts. The site is sometimes near to or overhanging water, and the nest is usually constructed at the end of a drooping branch, suspended from twigs or foliage. The striped honeyeater often nests in the vicinity of a nesting butcherbird. It builds a deep cup-shaped or bag-shaped nest, with thick walls and the lip of the opening turned slightly inwards. The nest is made from thin dry grass and coated with plant down, feathers or wool, such that the coating often completely obscures the grass framework. It is lined with spider webs, hair, wool or rootlets, and on occasion flowers and tissue paper. The striped honeyeater will commonly re-use material from previous nests.

The eggs are an elongated oval 2.4 cm (0.94 in) by 1.7 cm (0.67 in) somewhat pointed at one end. They are a dull white, smooth and lustreless or slightly lustrous, and moderately blotched with reddish-brown marks over the whole shell, though more profusely towards and over the larger end. The striped honeyeater lays an average of three eggs at 24-hour intervals. The eggs are incubated by both parents who sit constantly in alternating periods of around 20 minutes for 16 or 17 days. The fledging period is also around 16 days.

The nests of the striped honeyeater are parasitized by the pallid cuckoo (Cacomantis pallidus).

== Conservation status ==
Because of its wide distribution and stable population, the conservation status of the striped honeyeater has been evaluated by the IUCN as being of least concern.
