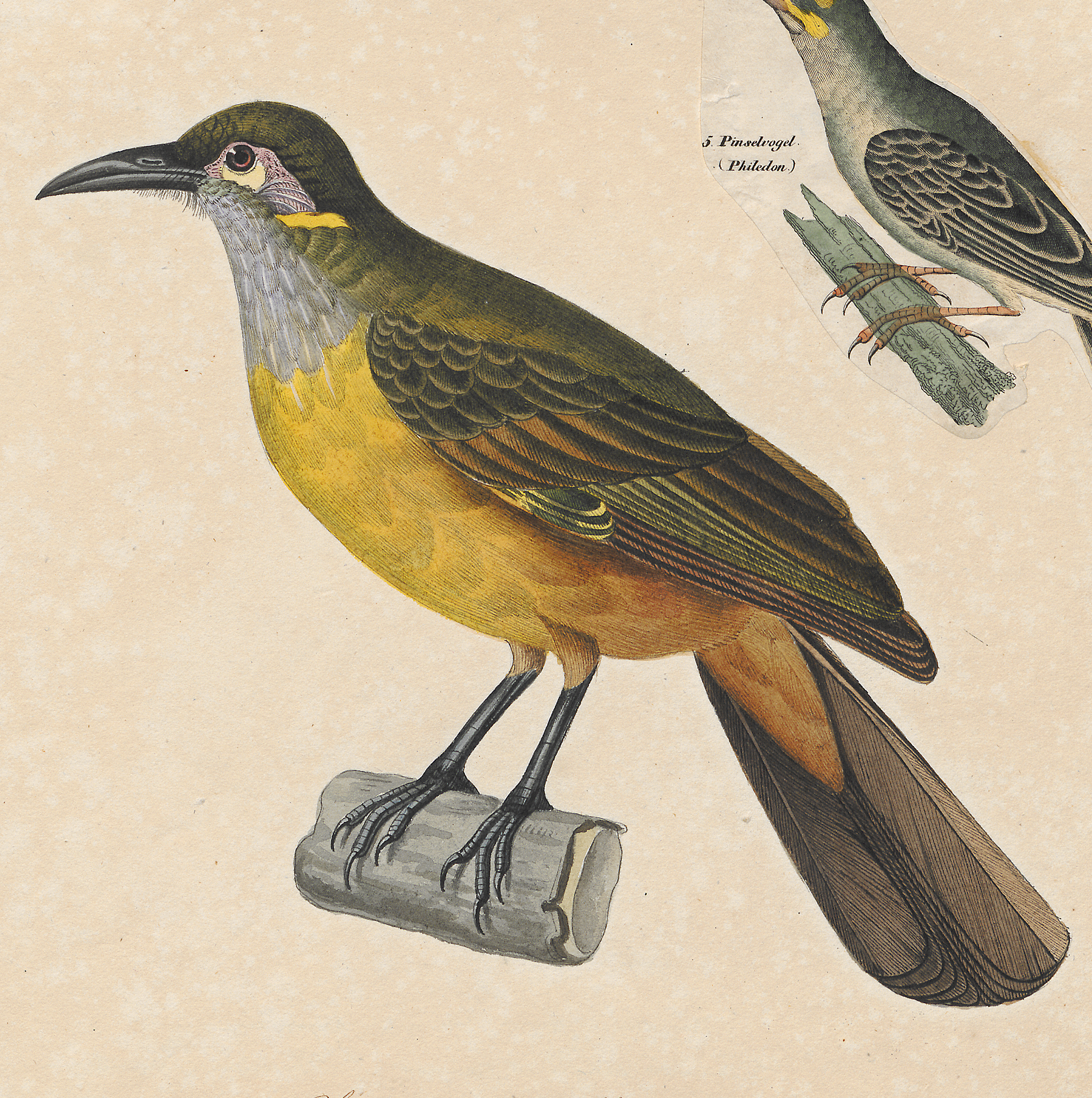

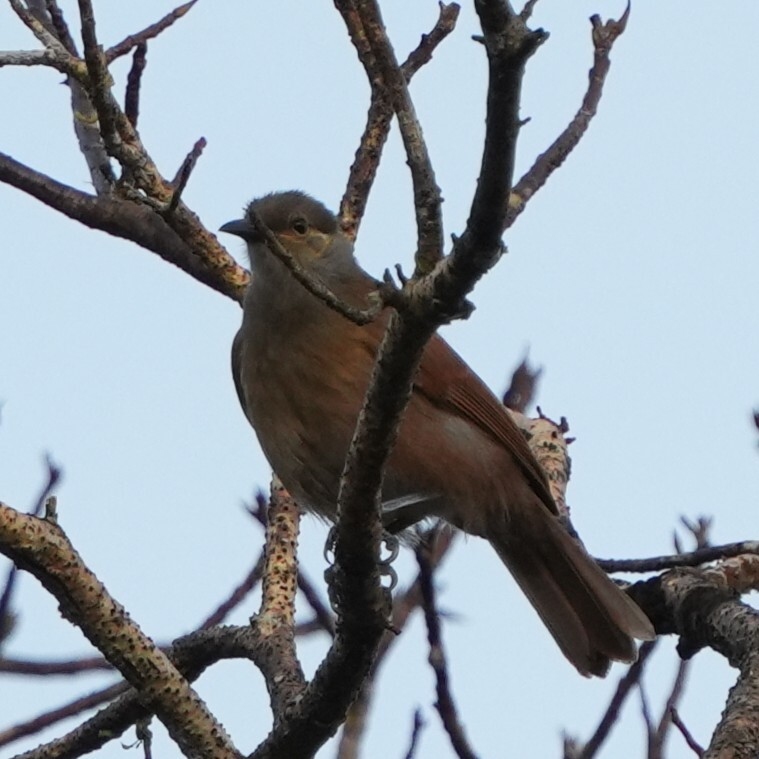

Conservation status
- Least Concern (IUCN 3.1)

Scientific classification
- Kingdom: Animalia
- Phylum: Chordata
- Class: Aves
- Order: Passeriformes
- Family: Meliphagidae
- Genus: Xanthotis
- Species: X. flaviventer

Binomial name
- Xanthotis flaviventer (Lesson, 1828)

= Tawny-breasted honeyeater =

Species of bird

The tawny-breasted honeyeater (Xanthotis flaviventer) is a species of bird in the family Meliphagidae. It is found in Australia, Indonesia, and Papua New Guinea. Its natural habitats are subtropical or tropical moist lowland forests, subtropical or tropical mangrove forests, and subtropical or tropical moist montane forests.
