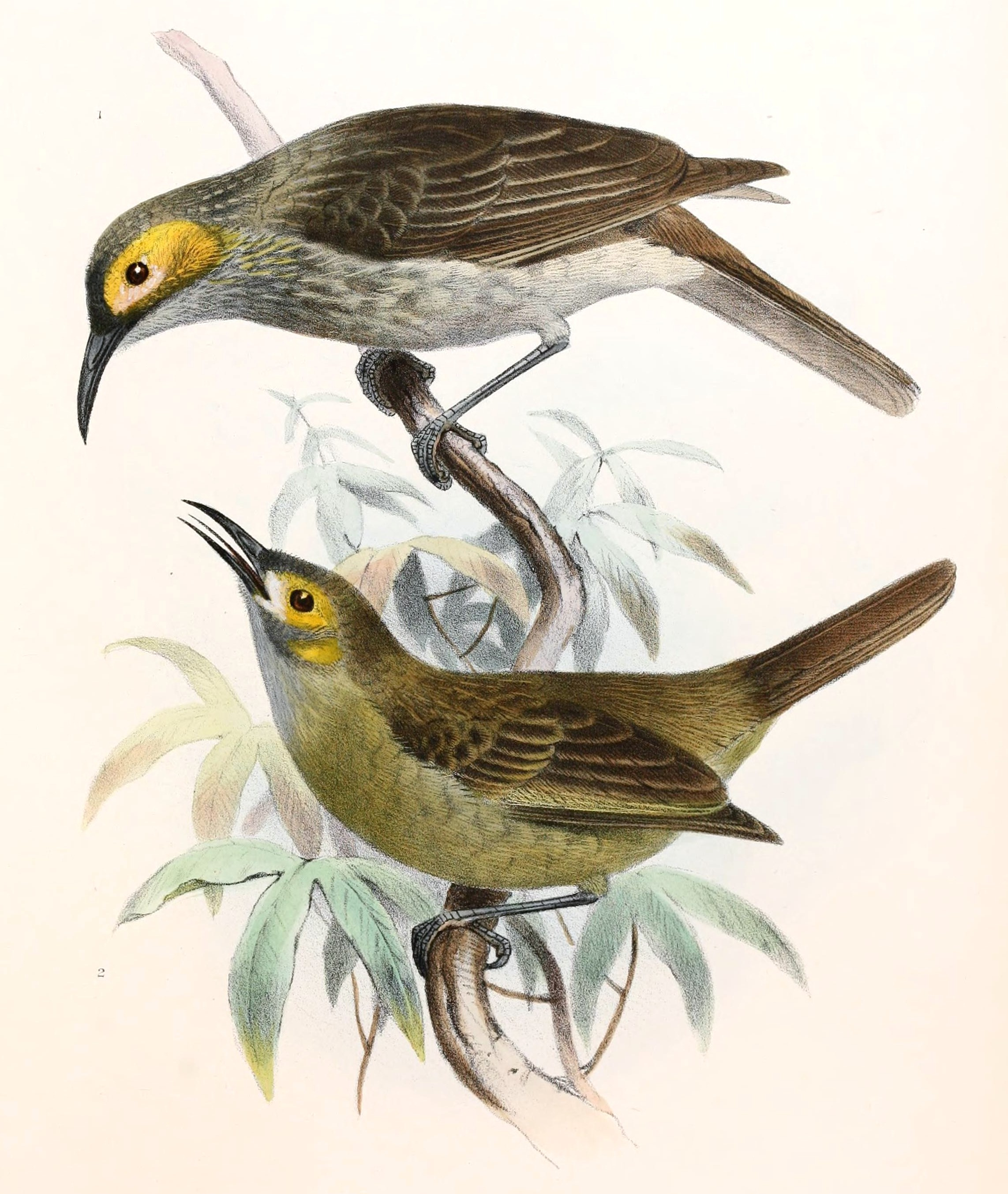

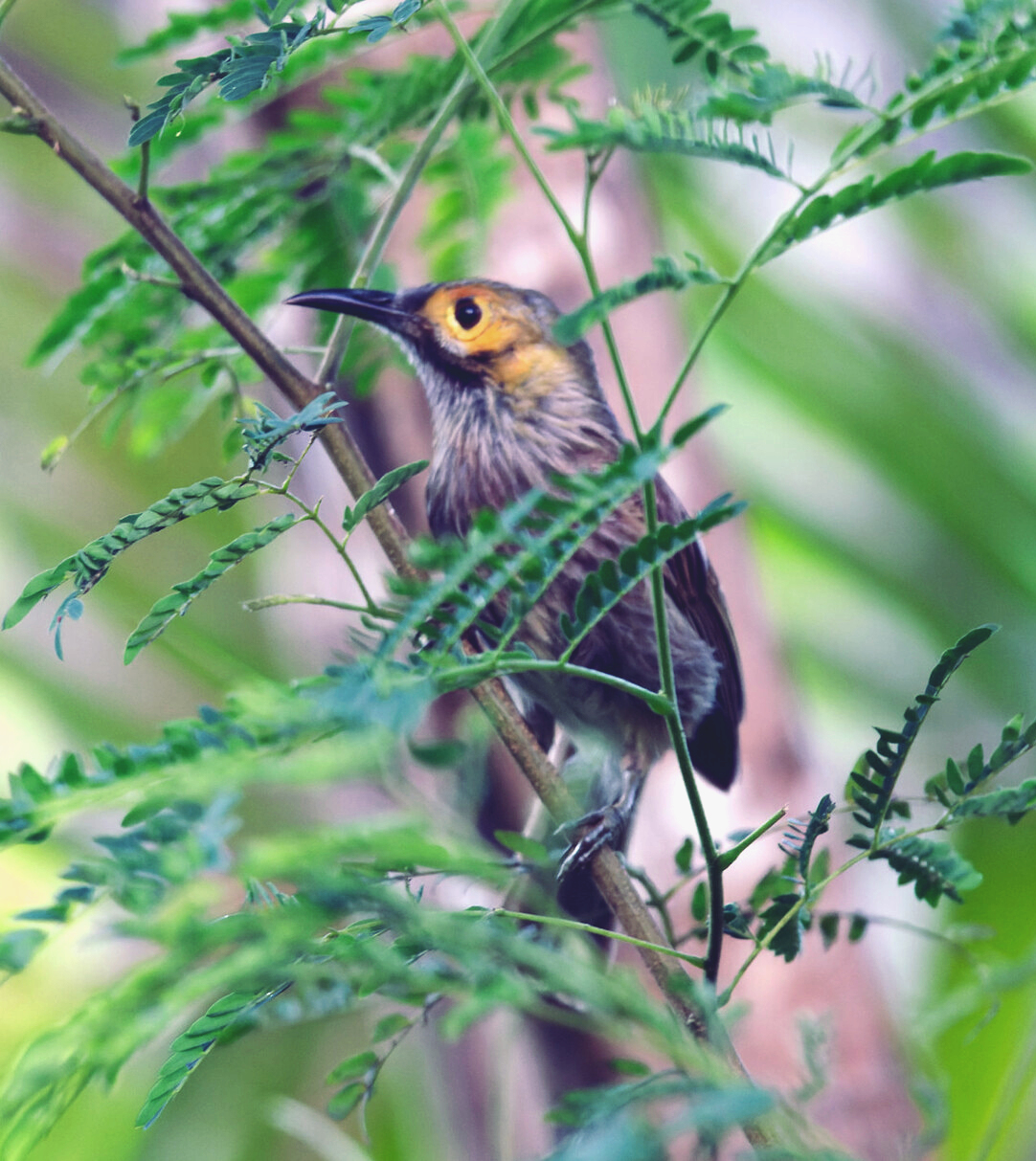

Conservation status
- Least Concern (IUCN 3.1)

Scientific classification
- Kingdom: Animalia
- Phylum: Chordata
- Class: Aves
- Order: Passeriformes
- Family: Meliphagidae
- Genus: Meliphacator; Mathews, 1930
- Species: M. provocator

Binomial name
- Meliphacator provocator (Layard, EL, 1875)

Synonyms
- Xanthotis provocator

= Kadavu honeyeater =

Species of bird

The Kadavu honeyeater (Meliphacator provocator) is a species of bird in the family Meliphagidae. It is the only species placed in the genus Meliphacator. It is endemic to the islands of Kadavu in Fiji. Its natural habitats are subtropical or tropical moist lowland forests and tropical mangrove forests.

The Kadavu honeyeater is described as being fairly large, somewhat resembling the spotted honeyeater, but with a yellowish-green bare skin eye-patch, bordered towards the rear by light green feathering on the ear coverts. It is dark streaked beneath with a whitish unstreaked central strip, and has upperparts which are greenish-grey with pale fringes to the wing feathers. This bird makes loud, ringing, friarbird-type calls, and prefers the tall mangroves along creek margins.

This species was previously placed in the genus Xanthotis. It was moved to Meliphacator based on the results of a molecular phylogenetic study published in 2019.
