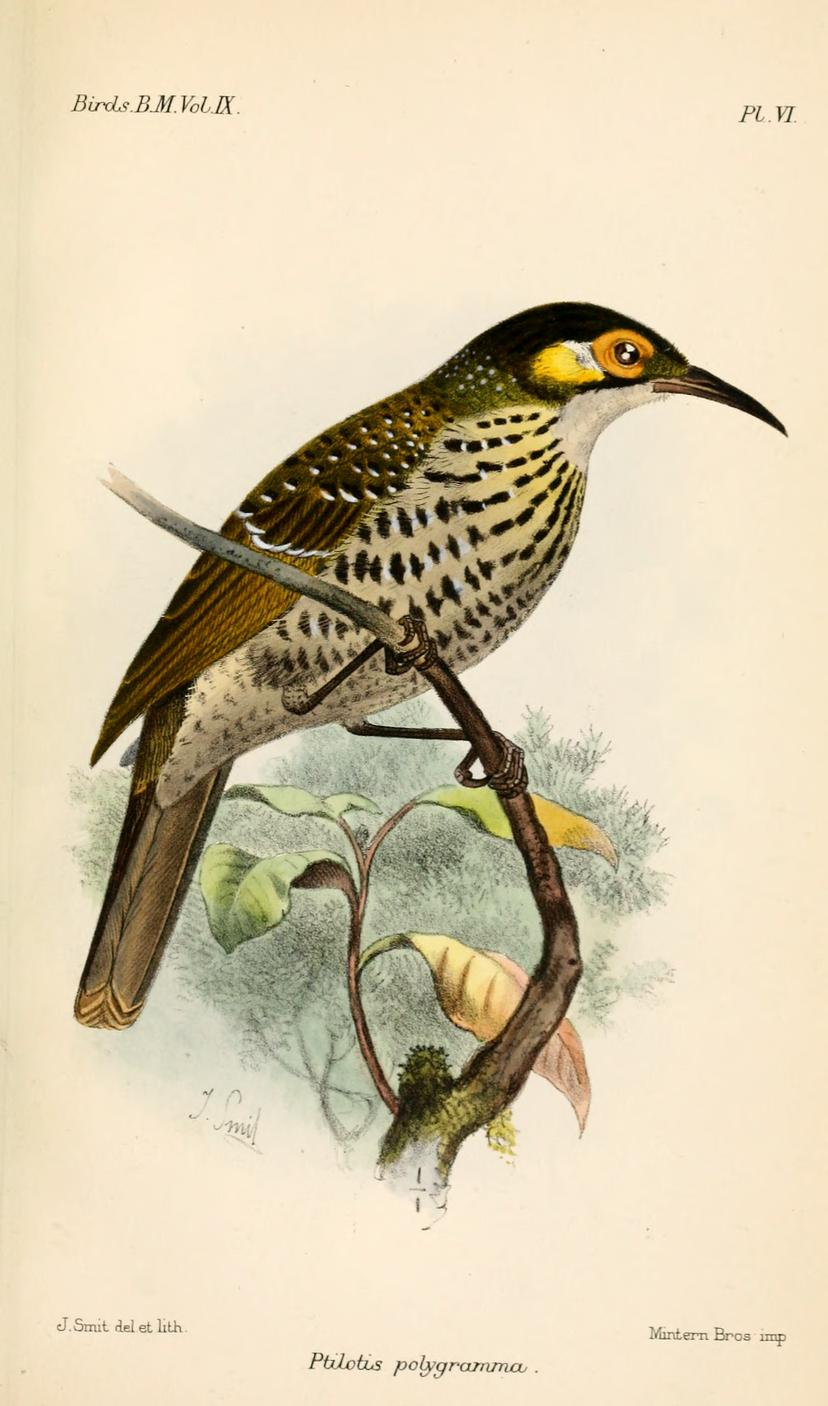
- Illustration by Joseph Smit, 1884
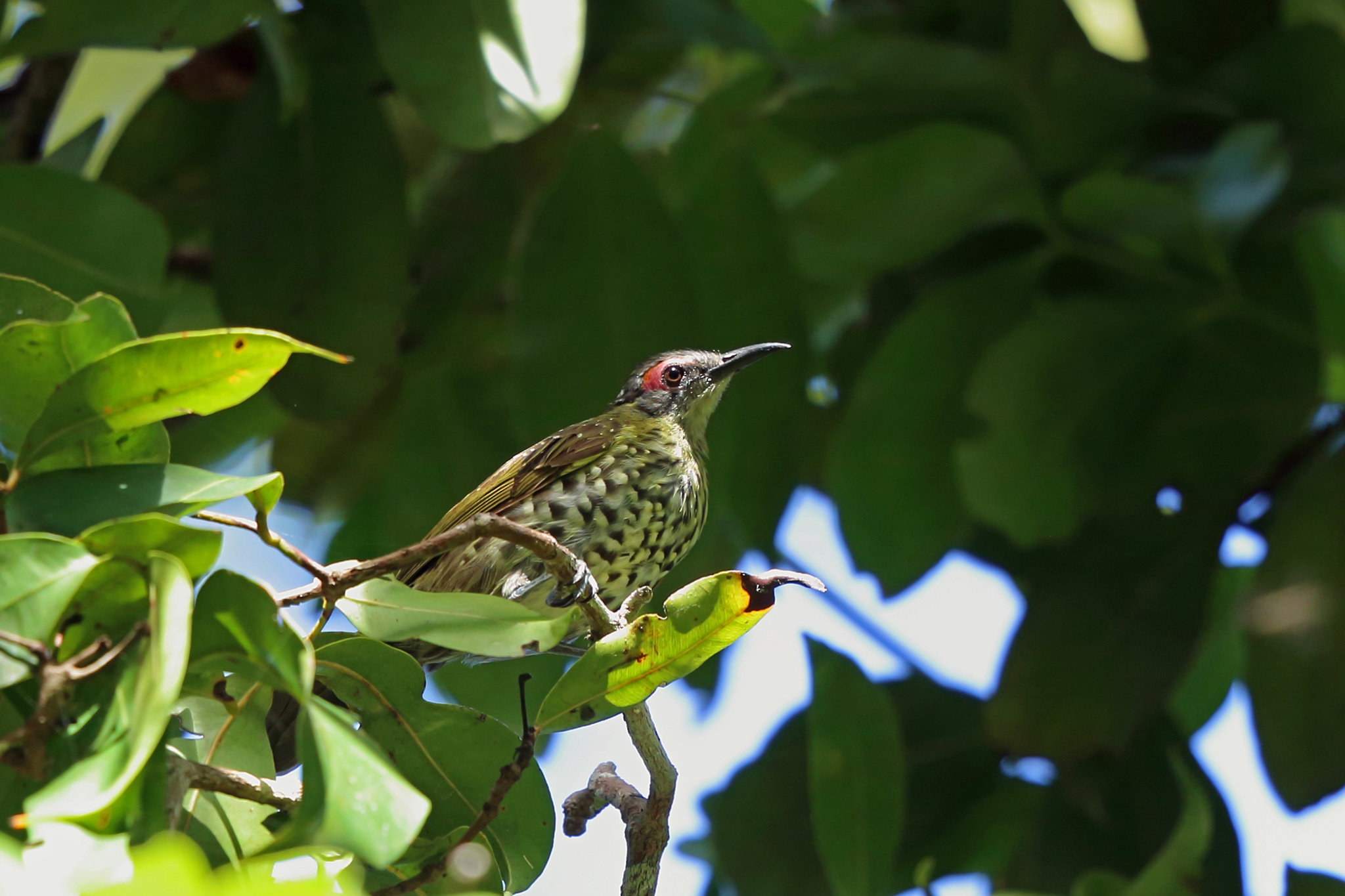

Conservation status
- Least Concern (IUCN 3.1)

Scientific classification
- Kingdom: Animalia
- Phylum: Chordata
- Class: Aves
- Order: Passeriformes
- Family: Meliphagidae
- Genus: Xanthotis
- Species: X. polygrammus

Binomial name
- Xanthotis polygrammus (G.R. Gray, 1862)

Synonyms
- Ptilotis polygramma

= Spotted honeyeater =

Species of bird

The spotted honeyeater (Xanthotis polygrammus) is a species of bird in the family Meliphagidae.

== Taxonomy and systematics ==
The Spotted Honeyeater was described by the English zoologist George Robert Gray in 1862. Its scientific name, Xanthotis polygrammus, is from Ancient Greek ξανθος xanthos ("yellow") and πολυγραμμος polugrammos ("white-streaked").

=== Subspecies ===
Six subspecies recognized:

- Xanthonis polygrammus polygrammus - Geographic range: Waigeo, in West Papuan.
- Xanthotis polygrammus kuehni - Geographic range: Misool, in West Papuan.
- Xanthotis polygrammus poikilosternos - Geographic range: Salawati and mountains of NW and W New Guinea.
- Xanthotis polygrammus septentrionalis - Geographic range: Mountains of N New Guinea from Mamberamo R E, including Foja Mts, Cyclops Mts, and mountains of Sepik R region, to Adelbert Mts.
- Xanthotis polygrammus lophotis - Geographic range: Mountains of Huon Peninsula and SE New Guinea.
- Xanthotis polygrammus candidior - Geographic range: S New Guinea.

== Description ==
This bird is a medium-small honeyeater that measures around 15 to 17 cm. In the lophotis race, the males weigh between 19.7 and 23.5 g, and females weigh around 18–19.5 g. The bird has a "moderately long and slightly curved bill". The bird has a dark head and neck with white spots on the back of the neck. It has a pink ring of facial skin around its eye. The honeyeater's back is dark with small white spots on it. Its stomach is white with a lime tint, and dark patterns and spots on it. The tail is a mix between brown and gray. The feathers under the wings are white. The bird has a white throat, black bill, and gray legs. The Males and females look the same, but males are a bit larger. The facial skin around its eye and dark patterns along its body really help this bird be identifiable.

== Distribution and habitat ==
It is found in Indonesia and Papua New Guinea. Its natural habitat is subtropical or tropical moist lowland forests.

== Diet ==
The diet of the spotted Honeyeater consists primarily of insects, worms, and other invertebrates which they forage in vegetation from the understory; but the Spotted Honeyeater also eats "nectar and fruit such as figs" that they find in the canopy and flowering plants. 97 Observations were recorded from a lowland forest; 49% of which observed that the bird's foraging occurred in the understory; Majority of which is between ground level and two meters above. Other observations saw the birds forage in the upper canopy (37%). The observations showed the birds were forage less in the subcanopy (7%) and lower canopy (7%). The birds are usually seen foraging alone, and rarely in pairs or small groups.

== Sounds and vocal behavior ==
The Spotted Honeyeater is usually very quiet, but can be noisy in small groups. The whistles consist of two distinct sounds repeated many times, commonly described as "wu-déé," and occasionally a "tup" in a descending pattern.

== Conservation status ==
The Spotted Honeyeater has been assessed for The IUCN Red List of Threatened Species in 2018 listed as least concern. The species has a large range which makes it not possible to approach the thresholds to be listed for vulnerable. Although the population size has not been estimated, there are no signs of decrease and the population trend tends to be stable.
