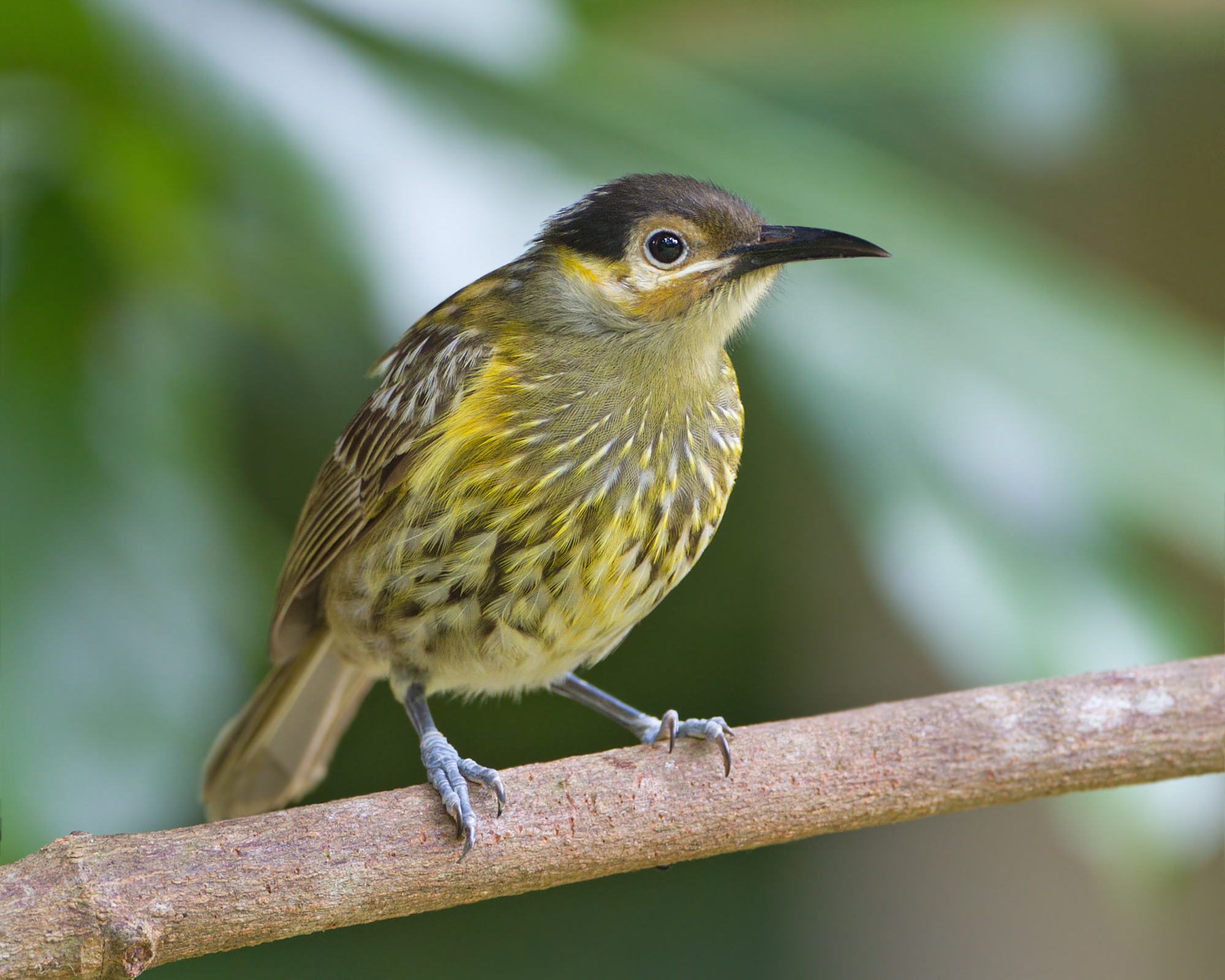

Conservation status
- Least Concern (IUCN 3.1)

Scientific classification
- Kingdom: Animalia
- Phylum: Chordata
- Class: Aves
- Order: Passeriformes
- Family: Meliphagidae
- Genus: Xanthotis
- Species: X. macleayanus

Binomial name
- Xanthotis macleayanus (EP Ramsay, 1875)
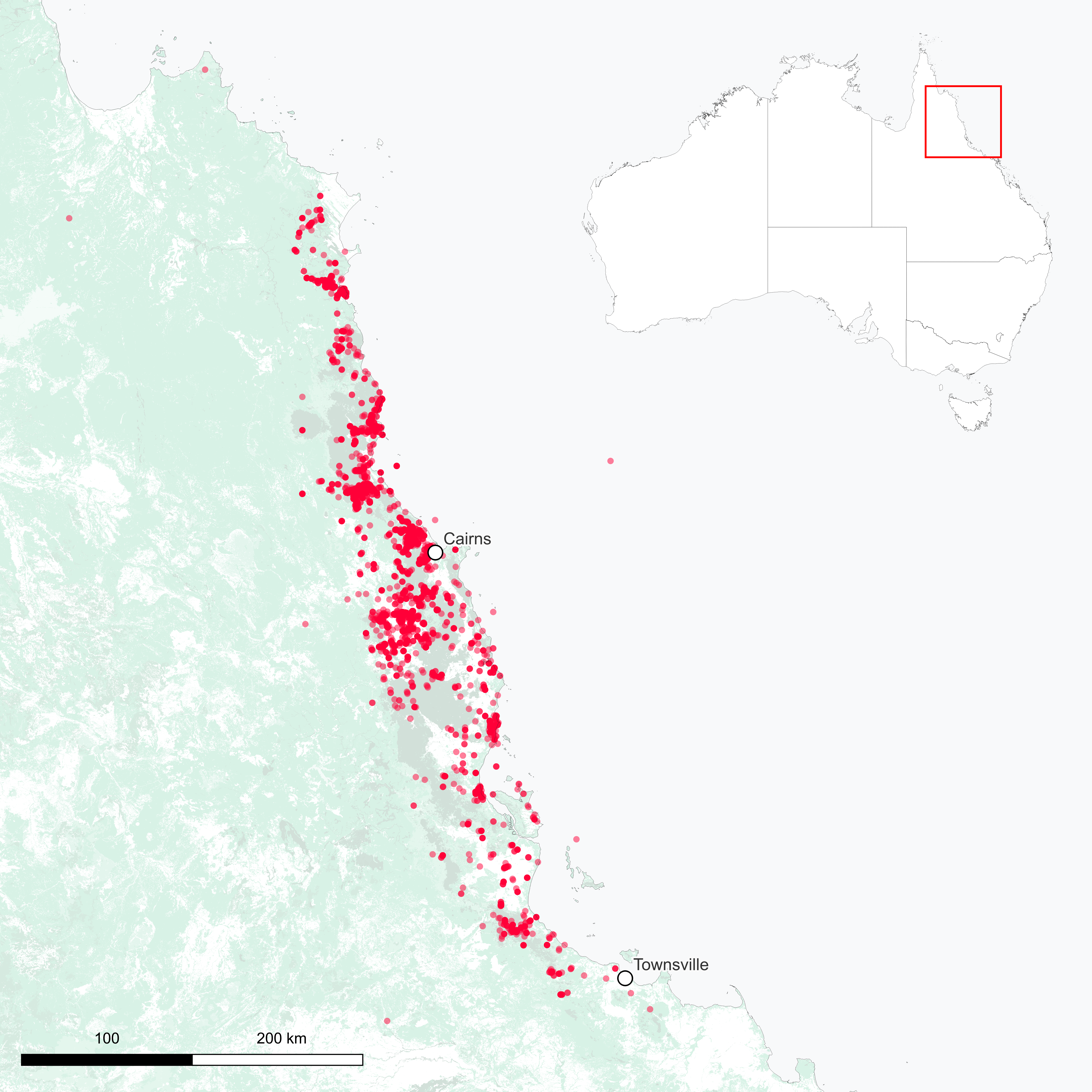
- Species distribution

Synonyms
- Ptilotis macleayanus

= Macleay's honeyeater =

Species of bird

Macleay's honeyeater (Xanthotis macleayanus) is a honeyeater endemic to Australia. Within Australia it has a limited distribution, occurring only in northern Queensland from Cooktown to the southern end of the Paluma Range. Its natural habitats are tropical dry forests and tropical moist lowland forests.

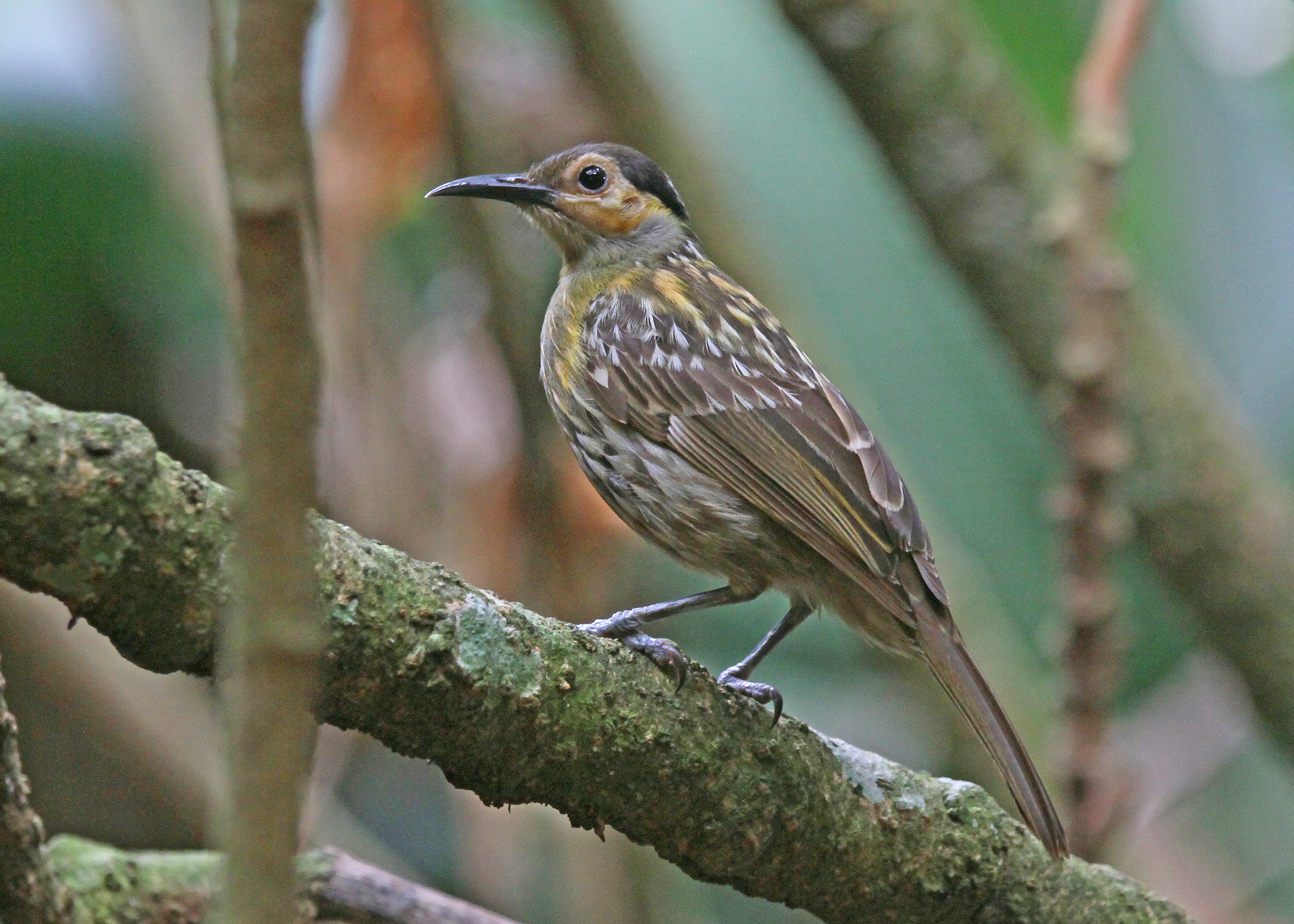
Near Kuranda, Queensland, Australia
