= Eucalyptus nubila =

Blue-leaved red ironbark

Scientific classification
- Kingdom: Plantae
- Clade: Tracheophytes
- Clade: Angiosperms
- Clade: Eudicots
- Clade: Rosids
- Order: Myrtales
- Family: Myrtaceae
- Genus: Eucalyptus
- Species: E. nubila

Binomial name
- Eucalyptus nubila Maiden & Blakely

Species of eucalyptus

Eucalyptus nubila, commonly known as the blue-leaved ironbark, is a type of ironbark tree found in eastern Australia, in Queensland and New South Wales. This plant is in family Myrtaceae.
