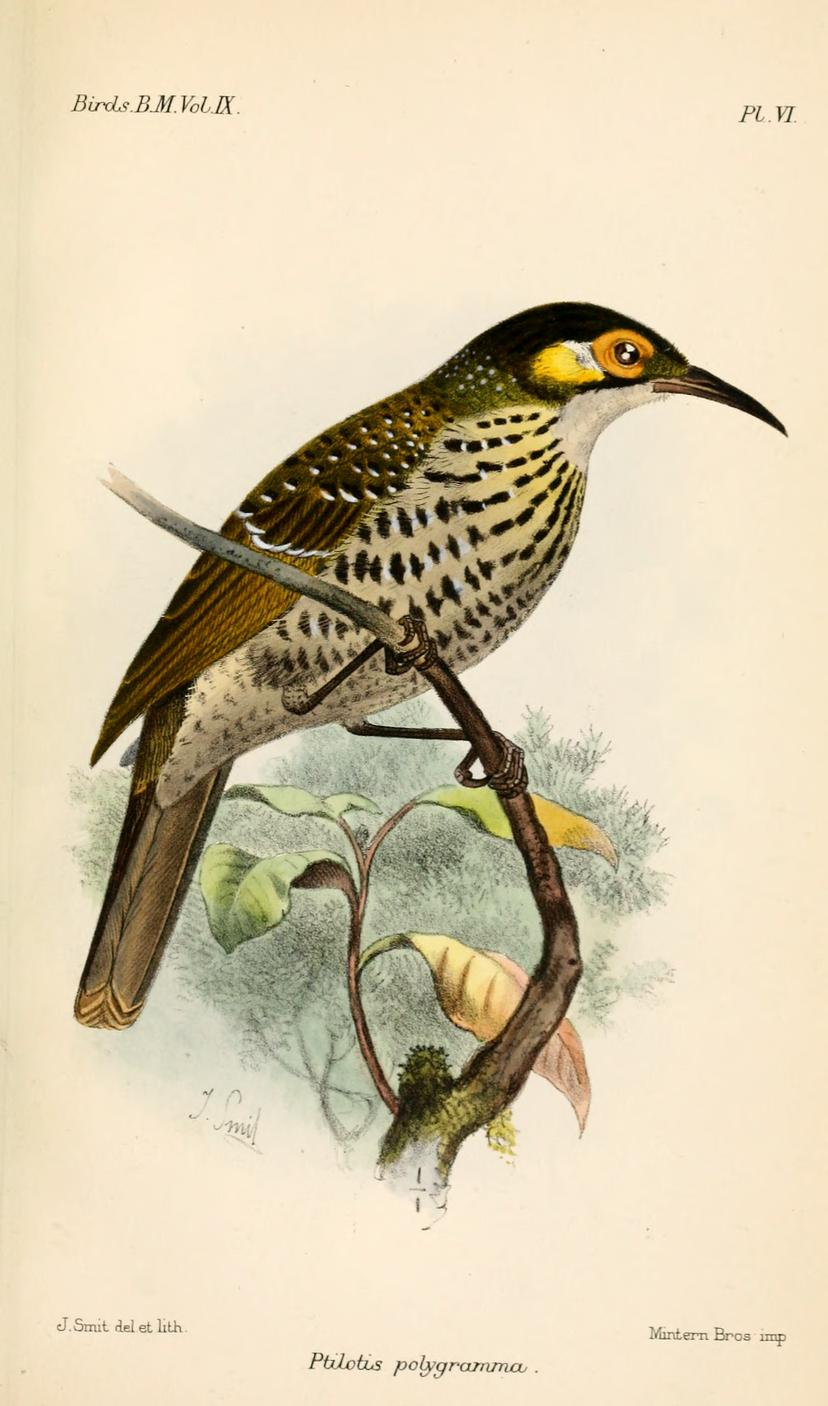
- Spotted honeyeater (Xanthotis polygrammus)

Scientific classification
- Kingdom: Animalia
- Phylum: Chordata
- Class: Aves
- Order: Passeriformes
- Family: Meliphagidae
- Genus: Xanthotis; Reichenbach, 1852

Type species
- Xanthotis flaviventris Reichenbach, 1852

= Xanthotis =

Genus of birds

Xanthotis is a genus of birds in the honeyeater family Meliphagidae.

The genus contains three species:

Image	Name	Common name
	Xanthotis polygrammus	Spotted honeyeater
	Xanthotis macleayanus	Macleay's honeyeater
	Xanthotis flaviventer	Tawny-breasted honeyeater

The Kadavu honeyeater (Meliphacator provocator) was formerly included in this genus. It was moved to its own genus Meliphacator based on the results of a molecular phylogenetic study published in 2019.
