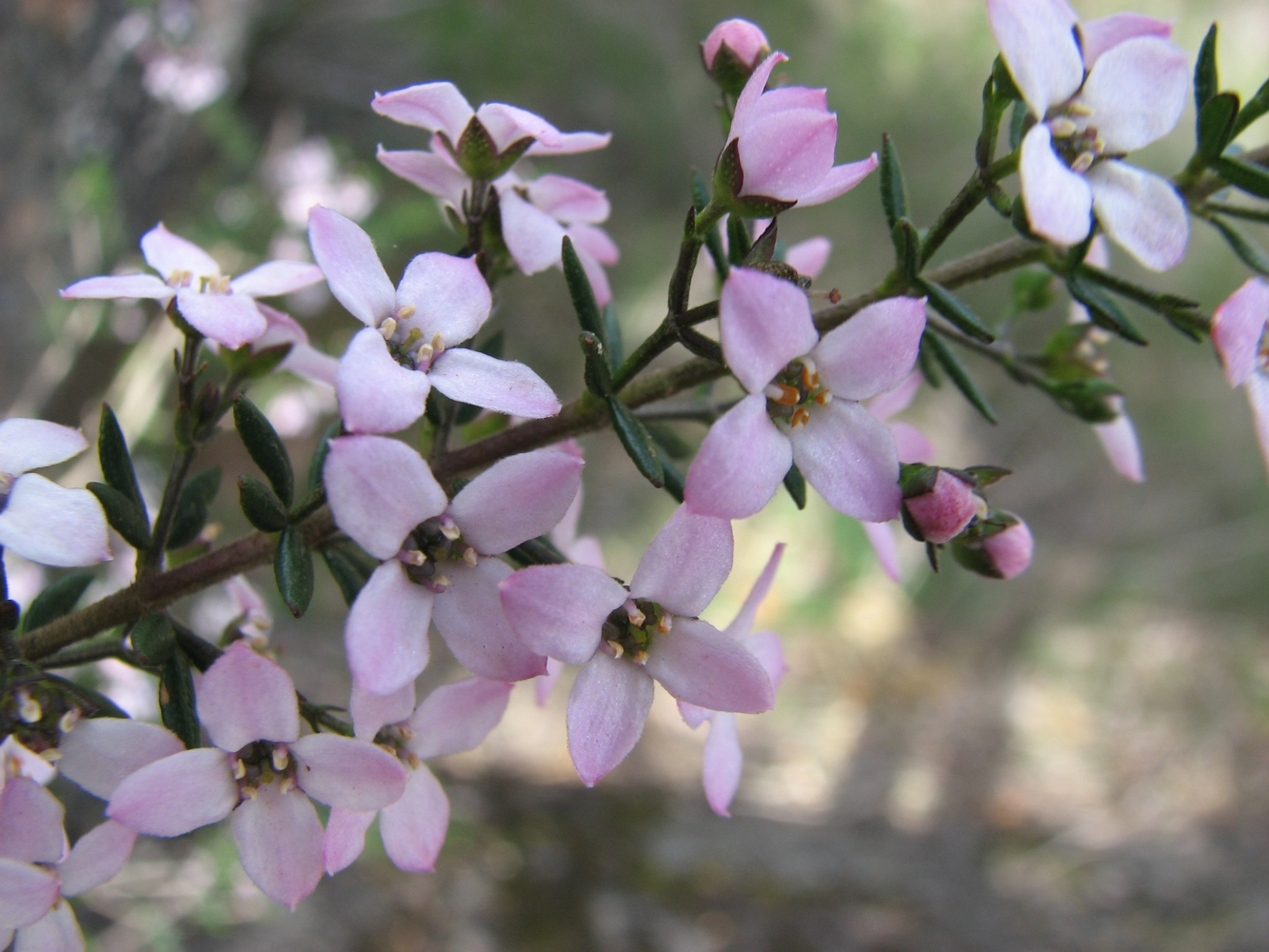
- Zieria aspalathoides at Kooyoora State Park, Victoria

Scientific classification
- Kingdom: Plantae
- Clade: Tracheophytes
- Clade: Angiosperms
- Clade: Eudicots
- Clade: Rosids
- Order: Sapindales
- Family: Rutaceae
- Genus: Zieria
- Species: Z. aspalathoides

Binomial name
- Zieria aspalathoides A.Cunn. ex Benth.

Synonyms
- Zieria laevigata var. aspalathoides (A.Cunn. ex Benth.) C.Moore & Betche

= Zieria aspalathoides =

Whorled zieria

Species of flowering plant

Zieria aspalathoides, commonly known as the whorled zieria, heath zieria, hairy zieria or heathy zieria, is a plant in the citrus family Rutaceae and is endemic to eastern Australia. It is a heath-like shrub with leaves that appear to be whorled and with pink flowers in groups of three, each with four petals and four stamens.

== Description ==
Zieria aspalathoides is a heath-like shrub which grows to a height of between 1 and 1.5 m (3 and 5 ft) with branches that are ridged and scaly or hairy, at least when young. The leaves are composed of three linear to lance-shaped leaflets 5–8 mm (0.2–0.3 in) long and 1–1.3 mm (0.04–0.05 in) wide. The leaves have a stalk less than 1 mm (0.04 in) long and are arranged in opposite pairs, so that there appears to be a whorl of six simple leaves. The edges of the leaflets are rolled under and the upper surface is a darker green than the lower one.

The flowers are pale to deep pink and are arranged in groups of mostly three, the groups usually longer than the leaves. The sepals are triangular, about 1.4 mm (0.06 in) long and usually smooth but hairy. The four petals are 4–5.5 mm (0.16–0.22 in) long, overlap at the edges and are covered with short, soft hairs and there are four stamens. Flowering occurs from late winter to early summer and is followed by the fruit which is a mostly glabrous follicle containing black seeds.

== Taxonomy and naming ==
Zieria aspalathoides was first formally described in 1863 by George Bentham from an unpublished description by Allan Cunningham. Bentham's description was published in Flora Australiensis. The specific epithet (aspalathoides) refers to a perceived similarity to plants in the genus Aspalathus - the suffix -oides means "likeness" in Latin.

Two subspecies have been described:

- Zieria aspalathoides subsp. aspalathoides which has at least some leaflets more than 4 mm (0.2 in) long;
- Zieria aspalathoides subsp. brachyphylla which has leaflets less than 3 mm (0.1 in) long.

== Distribution and habitat ==
This zieria occurs in Queensland, New South Wales and Victoria, growing in dry forest heath, usually in sandy soil and often between rocks. Subspecies aspalathoides is widespread from Victoria to the Atherton Tableland in Queensland, although it only occurs in a few scattered populations in Victoria. In New South Wales it occurs on the tablelands and western slopes. Subspecies brachyphylla only occurs on the Blackdown Tableland in Queensland.
