= Goonoo Important Bird Area =

Important Bird Area in New South Wales, Australia

Coordinates: 31°58′29″S 148°56′17″E

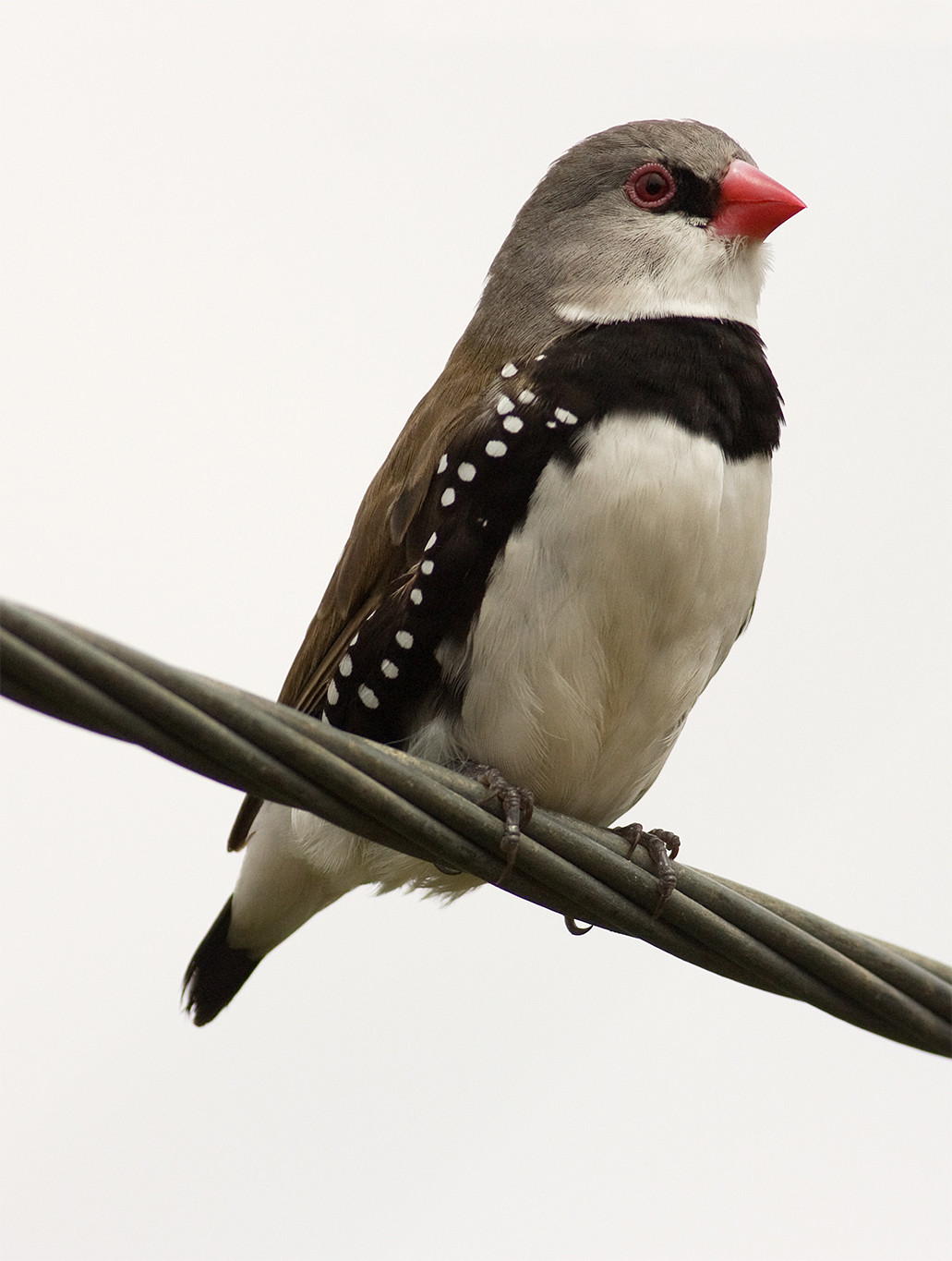
The IBA is an important site for the diamond firetail.

The Goonoo Important Bird Area is a 1034 km^{2} tract of wooded land in New South Wales, Australia. It lies between the towns of Dubbo, Gilgandra and Dunedoo, about 200 km north-west of Sydney. Formerly the Goonoo State Forest, much of the land is now within the Goonoo State Conservation Area (538 km^{2}) and the adjacent Goonoo National Park (91 km^{2}). The Important Bird Area (IBA) also includes (18 km^{2}) of the Coolbaggie Nature Reserve.

== Description ==
Goonoo IBA is mainly box-ironbark-callitris woodland with patches of mallee. It is surrounded by farmland. Past forest management involved logging the larger box trees to promote the growth of cypress pine and ironbark, but the site is now managed primarily for conservation. Much of the area was burned in fires in 2007.

== Birds ==
The site was identified as an IBA because it supports an isolated population of the vulnerable malleefowl as well as populations of diamond firetails and painted honeyeaters. It also supports glossy black-cockatoos, Gilbert's whistlers, and the easternmost, isolated, population of yellow-plumed honeyeaters.
