= Save a Species Walk =

Charitable event conducted in Australia to raise funds for rare and endangered plants

Save a Species Walk is an event in New South Wales in Australia focused on preservation of rare and endangered plants.

Each event includes nominating specific plants.

It involves a walk to raise money for seeds to be prepared and stored at the Australian PlantBank at the Australian Botanic Garden, Mount Annan.

== Plants by year ==
The plants identified below are from the Royal Botanic Garden website

=== 2014 ===
- needle-leaved geebung Persoonia acerosa
- glandular pink-bell Tetratheca glandulosa
- Olearia cordata
- Zieria involucrata

=== 2015 ===
- thick leaf star hair Astrotricha crassifolia
- Budawangs cliff heath Epacris gnidioides (syn. Budawangia gnidioides)
- white flowered wax plant Cynanchum elegans
- buttercup doubletail orchid Diuris aequalis
- sparse heath Epacris sparsa
- Fletchers drumsticks Isopogon fletcheri
- Evans sedge Lepidosperma evansianum
- Woronora beard heath Leucopogon exolasius
- dwarf mountain pine Pherosphaera fitzgeraldii
- velvet zieria Zieria murphyi
- black hooded sun orchid Thelymitra atronitida
- villous mint bush Prostanthera densa
- Euphrasia bowdeniae
- Grevillea parviflora subsp. supplicans
- Hibbertia stricta subsp. furcatula

=== 2016 ===
- narrow-leaved bertya Bertya ingramii
- four-tailed grevillea Grevillea quadricauda
- bordered guinea flower Hibbertia marginata
- Dorrigo waratah Alloxylon pinnatum
- tall knotweed Persicaria elatior
- Moonee Quassia Quassia sp. Mooney Creek
- trailing monotoca Monotoca rotundifolia
- creeping hop-bush Dodonaea procumbens
- Suggan Buggan mallee Eucalyptus saxatilis
- Bega wattle Acacia georgensis
- musty leek orchid Prasophyllum pallens
