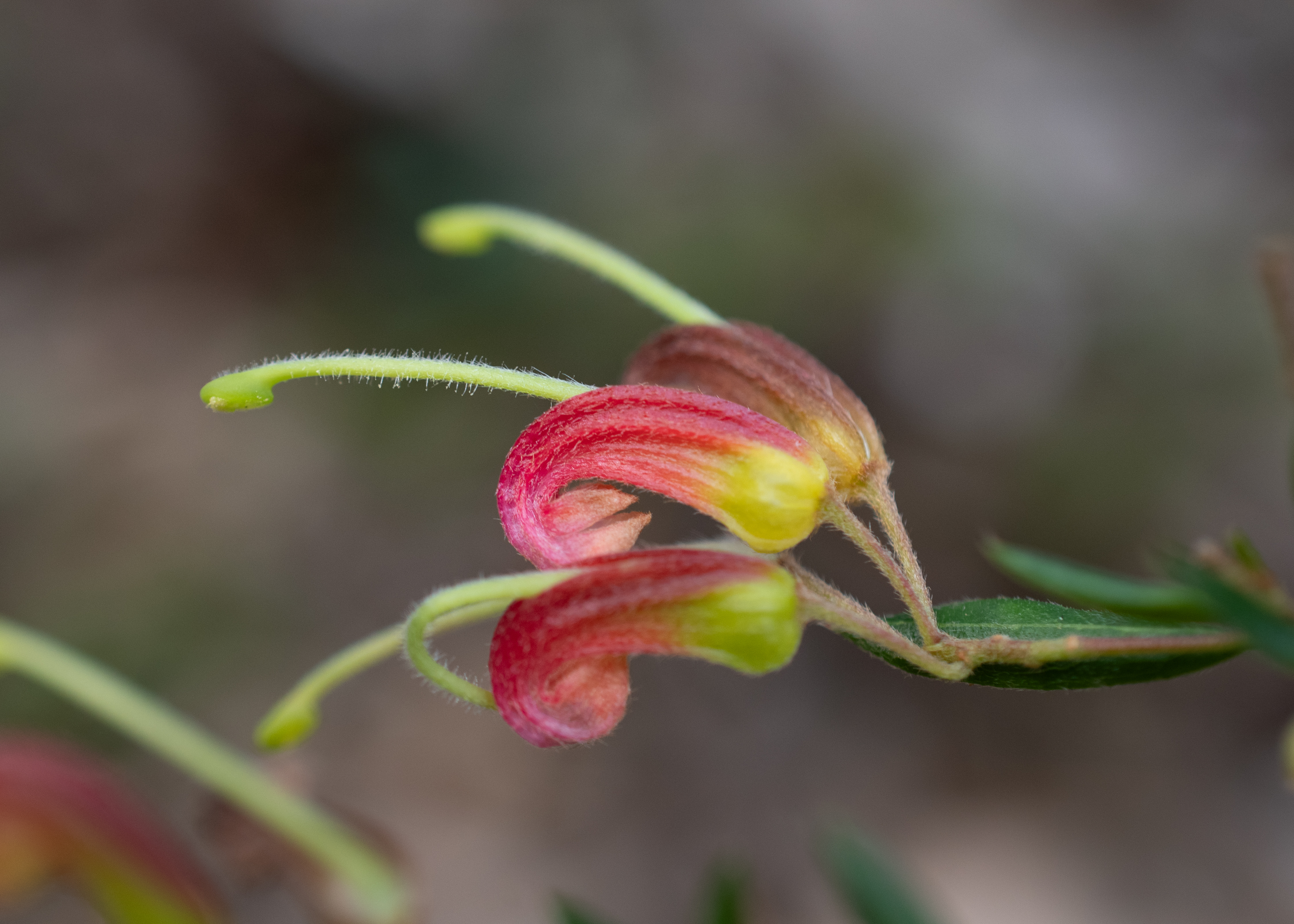
- In Illawarra Grevillea Park

Conservation status
- Vulnerable (IUCN 3.1)

- Vulnerable (EPBC Act)

Scientific classification
- Kingdom: Plantae
- Clade: Embryophytes
- Clade: Tracheophytes
- Clade: Spermatophytes
- Clade: Angiosperms
- Clade: Eudicots
- Order: Proteales
- Family: Proteaceae
- Genus: Grevillea
- Species: G. banyabba

Binomial name
- Grevillea banyabba Olde & Marriott

= Grevillea banyabba =

Species of shrub native to New South Wales, Australia

Grevillea banyabba, commonly known as Banyabba grevillea, is a species of flowering plant in the family Proteaceae and is endemic to north-eastern New South Wales. It is an open shrub with simple, narrowly egg-shaped leaves with the narrower end towards the base, and red and green flowers.

== Description ==
Grevillea banyabba is an open shrub that typically grows to a height of 0.8–1.5 m (2 ft 7 in – 4 ft 11 in), its branchlets covered with long, fine hairs. It has simple, narrowly egg-shaped leaves, 25–38 mm (0.98–1.50 in) long and 5–10 mm (0.20–0.39 in) wide with the edges slightly turned down and silky hair on the lower surface. The flowers are arranged in groups near the ends of branches or in leaf axils, each group with six to fourteen flowers on a rachis 8–15 mm (0.31–0.59 in) long, and are red with a green base. The pistil is 25–27 mm (0.98–1.06 in) long and covered with long, fine hairs. Flowering mostly occurs from August to October and the fruit is a follicle with a few long, soft hairs, and that splits down one side to release flat, winged seeds.

This species is distinguishable from the similar Mason's grevillea (G. masonii) by its longer leaves, smaller flowers and less oblique fruit and four-tailed grevillea (G. quadricauda) by its longer leaves and erect style present on the fruit.

== Taxonomy ==
Grevillea banyabba was first formally described in 1994 by Peter M. Olde and Neil R. Marriott in the journal Telopea, based on plant material near Grafton in 1992. The specific epithet (banyabba) refers to the Banyabba Nature Reserve, to which this species is mostly confined.

== Distribution and habitat ==
Banyabba grevillea occurs in sandy soil on or near the tip of ridges in forest in the Banyabba Nature Reserve, the Fortis Creek National Park and the Wombat Creek State Conservation Area, north-west of Grafton in north-western New South Wales. It often grows in association with bastard white mahogany (Eucalyptus psammitica), needlebark stringybark (Eucalyptus psammitica), sandstone rough-barked apple (Angophora robur) and pink bloodwood (Corymbia intermedia).

== Conservation status ==
This grevillea is listed as vulnerable under the Australian Government Environment Protection and Biodiversity Conservation Act 1999, the New South Wales Government Biodiversity Conservation Act 2016 and the IUCN Red List of Threatened Species.

The current population size of mature individuals is unclear, and further survey work is required to accurately determine it. In 1999, a population of approximately 14,000 individuals within 38 subpopulations were known from the NSW National Parks & Wildlife Service, with 90% of these occurring in a single subpopulation. Twenty years later, in 2019, it was estimated to be between 800–2000 mature individuals based on limited field observations, however another population estimate came to approximately 5000. Further unpublished data from the DPIE in 2019–2021 suggests an estimate population of 650 in Banyabba Nature Reserve and 640 in Fortis Creek National Park.

The main threats to this species include an increased frequency in fire regimes, increased drought, competition with invasive species, dieback disease caused by Phytophthora cinnamomi and habitat loss due to land clearing, road maintenance and timber harvesting.
