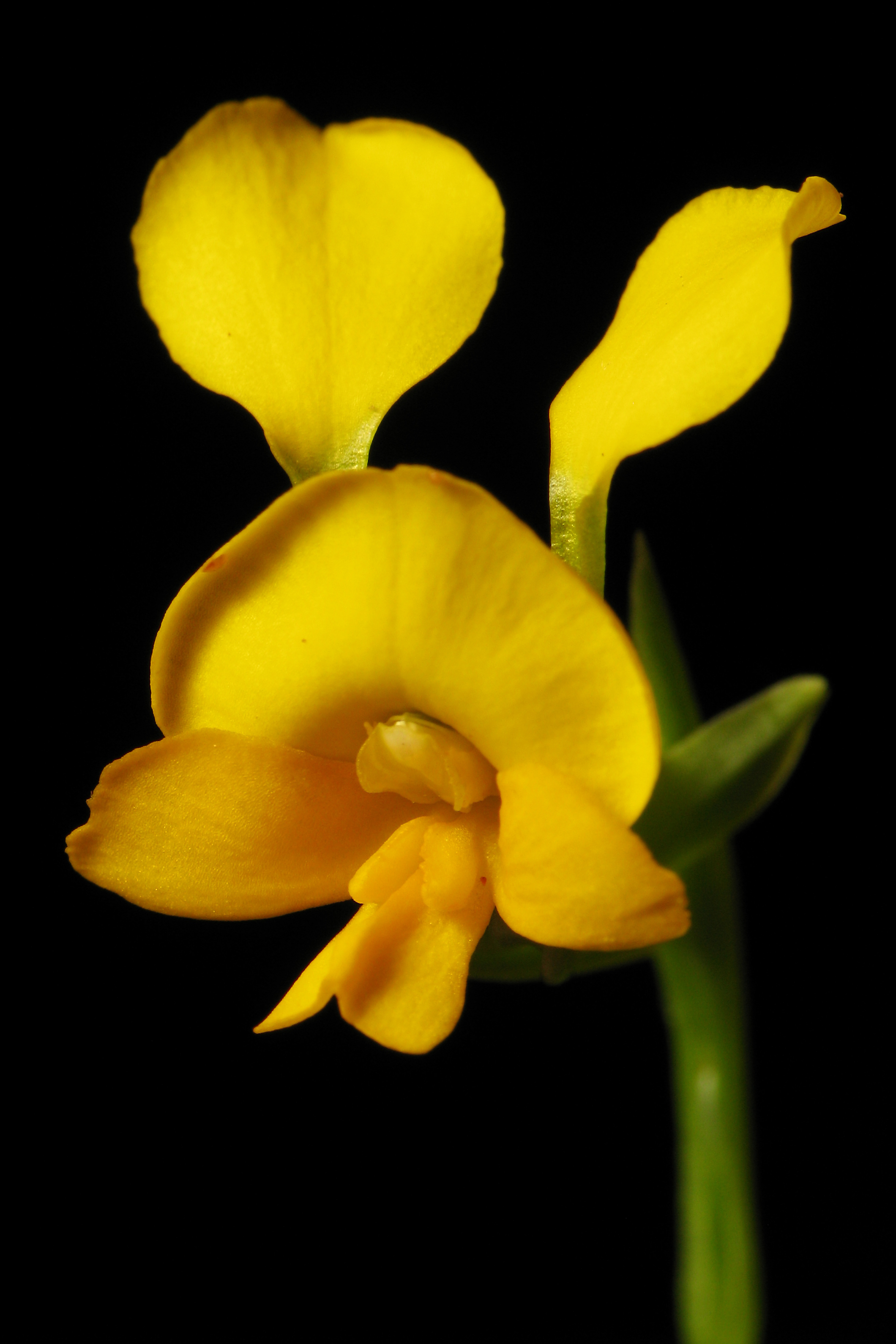

Conservation status
- Endangered (IUCN 3.1)

Scientific classification
- Kingdom: Plantae
- Clade: Tracheophytes
- Clade: Angiosperms
- Clade: Monocots
- Order: Asparagales
- Family: Orchidaceae
- Subfamily: Orchidoideae
- Tribe: Diurideae
- Genus: Diuris
- Species: D. aequalis

Binomial name
- Diuris aequalis F.Muell. ex Fitzg.

Synonyms
- Diuris maculata var. concolor Benth.

= Diuris aequalis =

Buttercup doubletail

Species of orchid

Diuris aequalis, commonly called the buttercup doubletail, a species of orchid which is endemic to New South Wales. It has two rolled leaves and spikes of two to five golden-yellow to orange flowers and is listed as "Endangered".

== Description ==
Diuris aequalis is a tuberous, perennial herb, grown to a height of 20–45 cm (8–20 in). There are two linear leaves arising from the base of the plant, each leaf 10–20 cm (4–8 in) long, 3–4 mm (0.1–0.2 in) wide and rolled so that the sides of the leaf face each other. There are about two and five golden-yellow to orange flowers arranged on a raceme, usually without spots, each about 25 mm (1 in) wide. The dorsal sepal is broadly egg-shaped to almost circular, 7–10 mm (0.3–0.4 in) long, 8–15 mm (0.3–0.6 in) wide above the flower. The lateral sepals are linear to lance-shaped, 8–13 mm (0.3–0.5 in) long, 2–3 mm (0.08–0.1 in) wide, sickle-shaped and green. The petals are erect, ear-like above the flower, 6–10 mm (0.2–0.4 in) long and 4–6 mm (0.2–0.2 in) wide. The labellum is 5–9 mm (0.2–0.4 in) long, 2.5–5 mm (0.1–0.2 in) wide and has three lobes, the medial lobe ridged in its centre and has two broad calli about 3.5 mm (0.1 in) long. Flowering occurs between October and December, following which the leaves die back to be replaced prior to the next flowering.

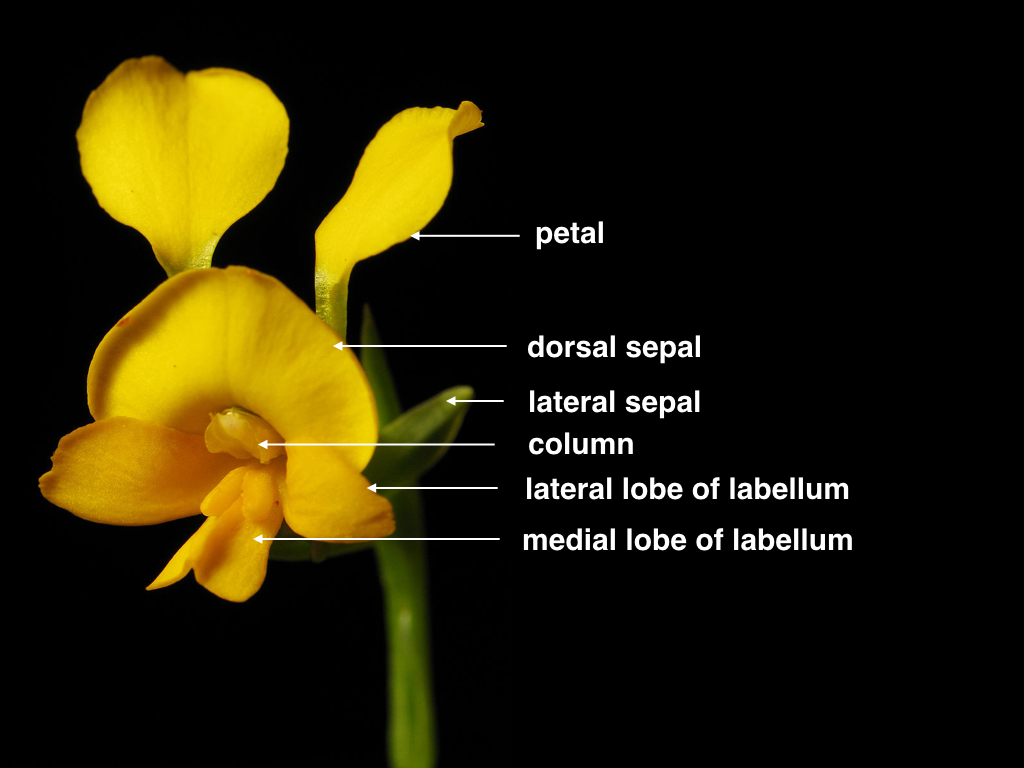
D. aequalis flower labelled

== Taxonomy and naming ==
Diuris aequalis was first formally described in 1876 by Robert D. FitzGerald in his book Australian Orchids from an unpublished description by Ferdinand von Mueller. The specific epithet (aequalis) is a Latin word meaning "like", "same" or "uniform".

== Distribution and habitat ==
Buttercup doubletail orchid occurs on the ranges and tablelands of New South Wales between Braidwood and the Kanangra-Boyd National Park where it grows in forest and low open woodland with a grassy understory, often on gentle slopes.

== Conservation ==
Only about 200 individual plants of D. aequalis are known, mostly on roadsides and on agricultural land. It is listed as "Vulnerable" (VU) under the Australian Government Environment Protection and Biodiversity Conservation Act 1999 (EPBC Act). The threats to its survival include land clearing, grazing, road maintenance and illegal rubbish dumping.

It was one of the plants targeted in the 2015 Save a Species Walk.
