= Prasophyllum pallens =

Scientific classification
- Kingdom: Plantae
- Clade: Tracheophytes
- Clade: Angiosperms
- Clade: Monocots
- Order: Asparagales
- Family: Orchidaceae
- Subfamily: Orchidoideae
- Tribe: Diurideae
- Subtribe: Prasophyllinae
- Genus: Prasophyllum
- Species: P. pallens

Binomial name
- Prasophyllum pallens D.L.Jones

Species of orchid

Prasophyllum pallens, commonly known as slaty leek orchid or musty leek orchid , is a species of orchid in the family Orchidaceae and is endemic to New South Wales. It has a single tubular, green leaf and up to thirty fragrant, pale tawny green to whitish flowers on a flowering stem.

== Description ==
Prasophyllum bagoense is a terrestrial, perennial, deciduous, herb with an underground tuber and a single tube-shaped leaf, 200–450 mm (7.9–17.7 in) long and 3–4 mm (0.12–0.16 in) wide. Between fifteen and thirty flowers are crowded along a flowering spike 60–100 mm (2.4–3.9 in) long, reaching a height of 300–500 mm (12–20 in). The flowers are crowded, pale tawny green to whitish, 18–21 mm (0.71–0.83 in) long and 8–11 mm (0.31–0.43 in) wide. As with others in the genus, the flowers are inverted so that the labellum is above the column rather than below it. The dorsal sepal is egg-shaped to lance-shaped, 9.5–11 mm (0.37–0.43 in) long, about 2.5–3.0 mm (0.098–0.118 in) wide and tapers to a point. The lateral sepals are pointed and project forwards, 2.5–3.0 mm (0.098–0.118 in) long and about 2.5 mm (0.098 in) wide. The petals are linear to oblong, 8.5–9.0 mm (0.33–0.35 in) long and 1.3–1.5 mm (0.051–0.059 in) wide. The labellum is lance-shaped but constricted near the middle, 10–12 mm (0.39–0.47 in) long and 5.5–6.0 mm (0.22–0.24 in) wide with a pale yellowish callus extending nearly to the tip of the labellum. Flowering occurs from October to December, usually in the absence of fire. The flowers are described as being both "sweetly fragrant" and as having "a rather unpleasant musty fragrance".

== Taxonomy and naming ==
Prasophyllum pallens was first formally described in 2000 by David Jones from a specimen collected on Mount Banks and the description was published in The Orchadian. The specific epithet (pallens) means "pale".

== Distribution and habitat ==
Slaty leek orchid grows in dense, low heath in shallow sandy soil over sandstone at altitudes of 1,000–1,100 m (3,300–3,600 ft) in the higher parts of the Blue Mountains of New South Wales.

== Conservation status ==
Prasophyllum pallens is listed as "vulnerable" under the New South Wales Government Biodiversity Conservation Act 2016. It was one of eleven species selected for the Save a Species Walk campaign in April 2016; scientists walked 300 km to raise money for collection of seeds to be prepared and stored at the Australian PlantBank at the Australian Botanic Garden, Mount Annan.
