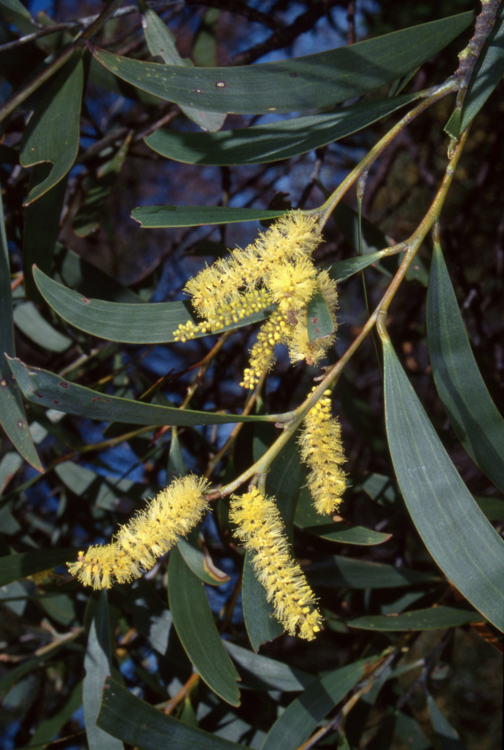

Conservation status
- Vulnerable (EPBC Act)

Scientific classification
- Kingdom: Plantae
- Clade: Tracheophytes
- Clade: Angiosperms
- Clade: Eudicots
- Clade: Rosids
- Order: Fabales
- Family: Fabaceae
- Subfamily: Caesalpinioideae
- Clade: Mimosoid clade
- Genus: Acacia
- Species: A. georgensis

Binomial name
- Acacia georgensis Tindale
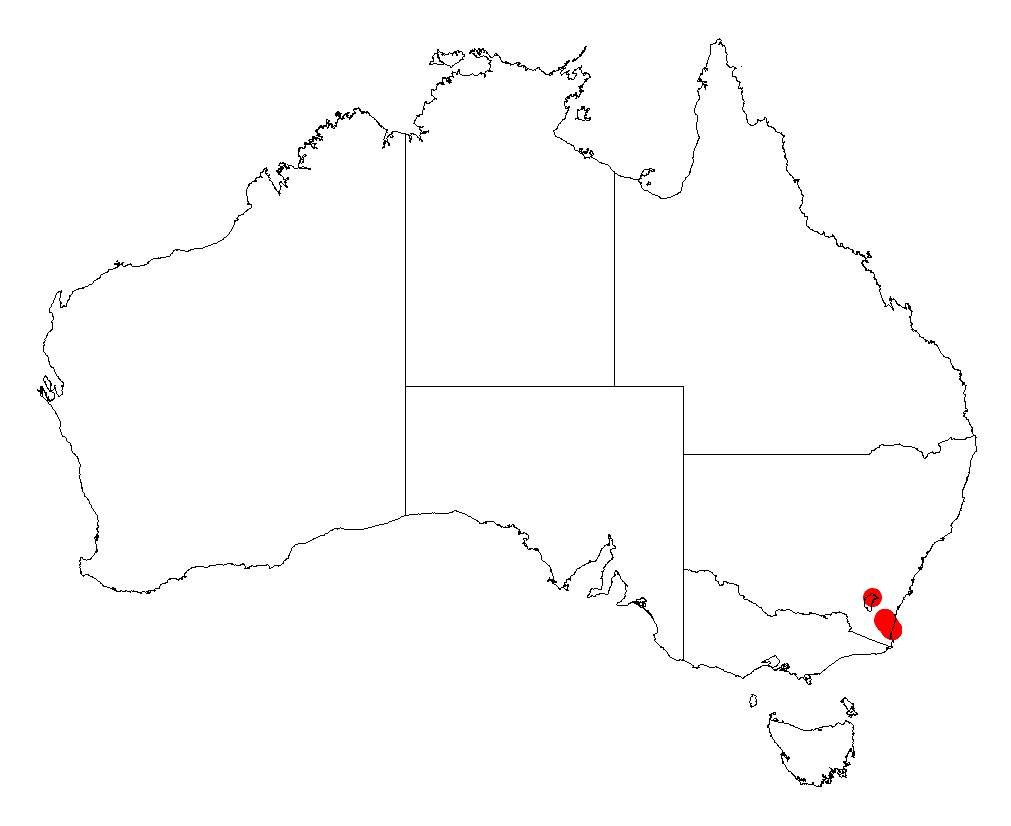
- Occurrence data from AVH

Synonyms
- Racosperma georgense (Tindale) Pedley

= Acacia georgensis =

Bega wattle

Species of legume

Acacia georgensis, commonly known as Bega wattle, Dr George Mountain wattle or Dr George wattle, is a species of flowering plant in the family Fabaceae and is endemic to a restricted area of New South Wales, Australia. It is an erect or spreading shrub or tree with corrugated, furrowed or deeply fissured bark, more or less terete branchlets, very narrowly elliptic, sickle-shaped phyllodes, spikes of pale yellow flowers and linear, thinly leathery pods slightly constricted and raised over the seeds.

== Description ==
Acacia georgensis is an erect or spreading shrub or tree that typically grows to a height of 2–10 m (6 ft 7 in – 32 ft 10 in) and has brown or grey corrugated to furrowed or deeply fissured bark. Its upper branchlets are mostly terete and often covered with a fine, white powdery bloom. Its phyllodes are very narrowly elliptic and sickle-shaped, 74–168 mm (2.9–6.6 in) long, 15–30 mm (0.59–1.18 in) wide and leathery with three main prominent veins and two less prominent veins continued to the base. There is a gland 1–3 mm (0.039–0.118 in) above the pulvinus. The flowers are pale yellow, usually borne in two oval to cylindrical spikes 7–35 mm (0.28–1.38 in) long. Flowering occurs from August to October and the pods are linear, 20–65 mm (0.79–2.56 in) long, 3–4 mm (0.12–0.16 in) wide, thinly leathery and glabrous. The seeds are oblong, 3–4.5 mm (0.12–0.18 in) long and black.

== Taxonomy ==
Acacia georgensis was first formally described in 1980 by Mary Tindale in the journal Telopea. The specific epithet (georgensis) refers to Doctor George Mountain in the Bega Valley Shire, where it was collected in 1977.

== Distribution and habitat ==
Bega wattle occurs on the south coast of New South Wales from around Wadbilliga River to Tathra and Bega and extending down the eastern side of Great Dividing Range to around Bemboka, the Yowrie River and Tuross River. It grows in scrub, heath or open dry sclerophyll forest on exposed rocky outcrops, slopes and ridges in thin soils over sandstone, conglomerate or granite.

== Conservation status ==
Acacia georgensis is listed as "vulnerable" under the Australian Government Environment Protection and Biodiversity Conservation Act 1999 and the New South Wales Government Biodiversity Conservation Act 2016. It was one of eleven species selected for the Save a Species Walk campaign in April 2016 when scientists walked 300 km to raise money for collection of seeds to be prepared and stored at the Australian PlantBank at the Australian Botanic Garden Mount Annan.

== See also ==
- List of Acacia species
