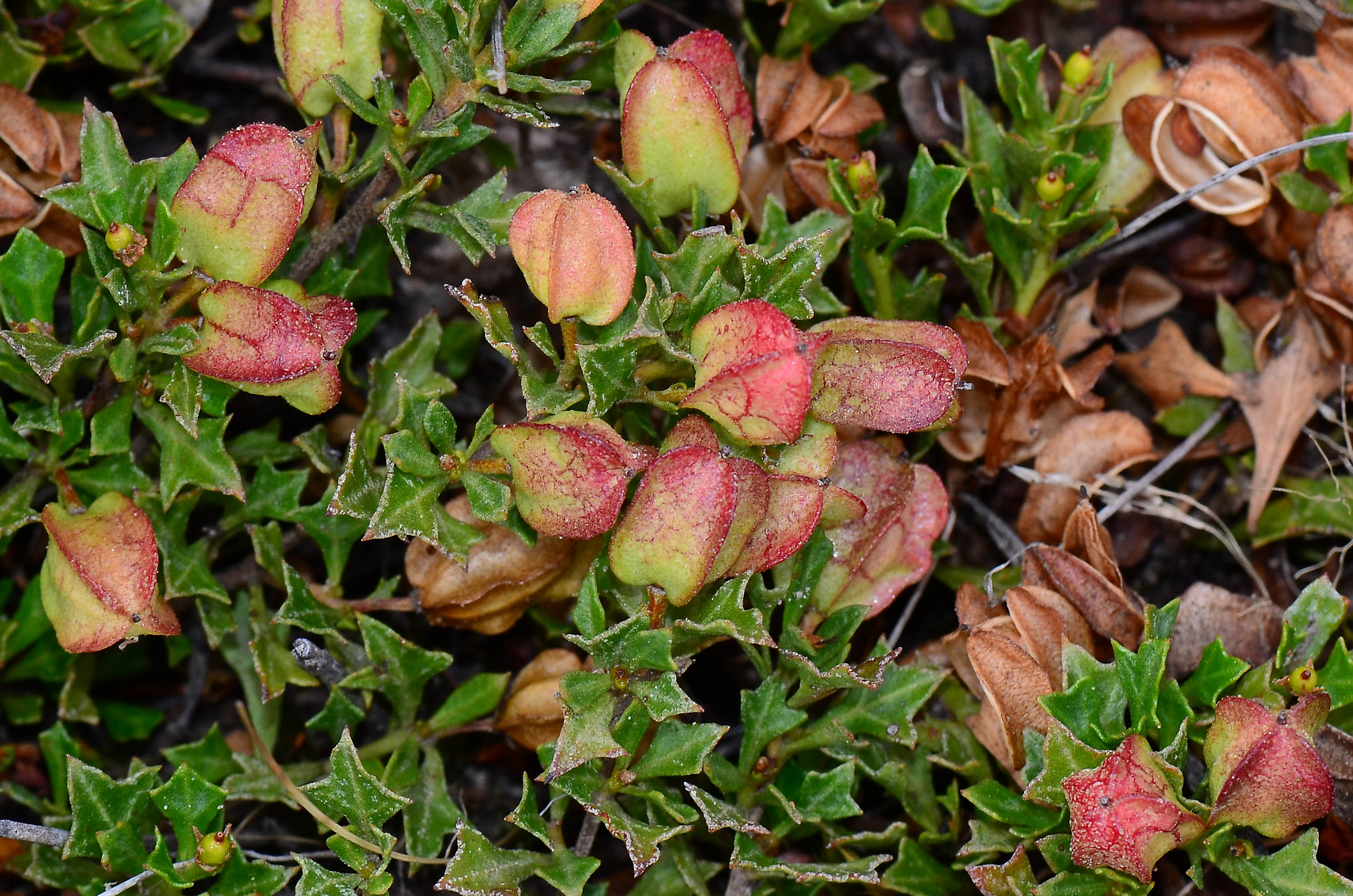
- Foliage and fruit of Dodonaea procumbens near the Grampians

Conservation status
- Vulnerable (EPBC Act)

Scientific classification
- Kingdom: Plantae
- Clade: Tracheophytes
- Clade: Angiosperms
- Clade: Eudicots
- Clade: Rosids
- Order: Sapindales
- Family: Sapindaceae
- Genus: Dodonaea
- Species: D. procumbens

Binomial name
- Dodonaea procumbens F.Muell.

= Dodonaea procumbens =

Trailing hop-bush

Species of flowering plant

Dodonaea procumbens, commonly known as trailing hop bush or creeping hop-bush, is a species of shrub in the genus Dodonaea found in eastern Australia. It occurs in many places in Australia such as South Australia, New South Wales and Victoria. Although the information on the abundance of this species is limited, it is estimated that about 5,000 plants occur in about 55 wild populations. The species is currently facing many threats such as the expansion of road facilities, the development of residential and agricultural areas, increased grazing regimes, weed invasions, and regimes changing of fire. As a result, it is listed as vulnerable and threatened. Therefore, it is necessary to provide protective solutions for the long-term development and survival of this species.

== Description ==
Dodonaea procumbens is a small low spreading shrub in the family Sapindaceae, with a diameter of about 1.5 m (4 ft 11 in) and a height of about 20 cm (7.9 in). The species is dioecious or polygamodioecious. The branches are dense and often have roots, and the branchlets are lightly ribbed and are angular. The leaves are simple, lanceolate with the more pointed end at the base, sessile, 10 to 22 mm (0.39 to 0.87 in) long and 4.5 to 7 mm (0.18 to 0.28 in) wide. The edges of the leaves are usually irregular with one to four long teeth up to 2.5 mm (0.10 in) and usually located above the leaf centre. The leaves are light green, have sparse or rarely smooth hairs, a reduced base, and thickened margins. The flowers are terminal, solitary, or paired with small yellow, orange-tipped flowers. Flowers are unisexual or bisexual, sometimes forming double inflorescences, the length of pedicels between 3.5 and 6 mm (0.14 and 0.24 in), and the pedicel of male flowers are usually longer. Sepals are 4 to 7, have a linear-lanceolate shape, are often unequal and their outer surface is glabrous. Sepals in the male flower are recurved while the sepals in the female flowers surround the ovary and are free, recurrent at the top and lower middle. Male and bisexual flowers have 8 to 10 stamens while female flowers have no stamens. In contrast, the ovary in female and bisexual flowers has 4 carpels while male flowers have no carpels. Capsule have 3-4 wings, reddish-brown when mature, 11 to 13 mm (0.43 to 0.51 in) long, and 9 to 10.5 mm (0.35 to 0.41 in) wide, extending from the apex to the base of the carpel. The seed is black, 5 mm (0.20 in) long, and 3 mm (0.12 in) wide with cream aril.

== Taxonomy ==
Dodonaea procumbens was first formally described by in 1854 Ferdinand von Mueller in Transactions of the Philosophical Society of Victoria. The specific epithet (procumbens) refers to the species' low-lying or prostrate habit.

== Distribution ==
This hopbush occurs in scattered populations across south-eastern Australia, in Victoria, South Australia and southern New South Wales. In Victoria, it is found mainly in the south-west of the state (Penola-Dergholm area, Grampians and Lake Fyans), also on the Victorian Volcanic Plains, Victorian Riverina, and Gippsland Plain. In New South Wales, it occurs near Cooma in the Monaro region, in a small area between Tarago and Bungee Peak in the Southern Tablelands, in the South Eastern Highlands IBRA bioregion. In South Australia, it occurs near Port Lincoln in the Eyre Yorke Block bioregion, near Clare and Burra in the Mt Lofty Range in the Flinders Lofty Block bioregion, on Kangaroo Island in the Kanmantoo bioregion, and near Penola in the Naracoorte Coastal Plain bioregion. In 2009, Dodonaea procumbens was thought to be extinct in the east of Victoria, however, during a field investigation for the Dutson Downs Bushfire Management Plan in October 2009, it was discovered again at Dutson Downs.

== Habitat and ecology ==
=== Habitat ===
Dodonaea procumbens grows in low-lying areas, including in open Eucalyptus camaldulensis, Eucalyptus fasciculosa and Eucalyptus leucoxylon woodlands. Additionally, this species often grows in winter-wet areas in woodland, low open forests, on sands and clays. It is found in natural grassland or grassy woodland of Eucalyptus pauciflora in New South Wales and in grassy woodland of Eucalyptus camaldulensis in western Victoria. This species often occurs in disturbed or exposed locations such as roadsides or outcrops of rocks.

=== Ecology ===
Dodonaea procumbens is usually found on clayey soils or on inclined or vertical rocks. This species grows in open spaces where there is little competition from other plants and generally does not exist in areas where the vegetation is heavily grazed. It grows roots along the trunk to help the plant recover from minor disturbances. In addition, this species is pollinated or dispersed by papery fruits.

Flowers usually bloom in the summer, from November to February. It is also the time that the tree bears fruit and fruit takes about ten to twelve months to mature.

== Putative hybridisations ==
Sometimes plants will be hybridized with closely related species in the same plant group when they are in the same area. Some species of hop bush in the wild are bred due to some external factors. Crossbreeds often combine traits and features from their parents to produce offspring. The offspring of the hybrid can be difficult to distinguish from either parent plant species.

The hypothetical hybridization between Dodonaea procumbens and Dodonaea viscosa in two populations, found one in central South Australia and one in western Victoria, suggests that there may be an ongoing genetic flow between members of this clade.

== Similar species ==
The Dodonaea procumbens look quite similar to other Dodonaea species such as the Dodonaea viscosa (common name is Sticky hop bush) but it can still be distinguished through distinct features, including tree height, leaf shape, and prostrate habit. Specifically, Dodonaea procumbens is a small low spreading shrub, about 20 centimeters in height and leaves are 10 to 22 millimeters long while Dodonaea viscosa is an erect shrub, up to 5 meters in height and leaves are 10 to 155 millimeters long.

== Conservation status ==
This hopbush is listed as "vulnerable" under the Australian Government Environment Protection and Biodiversity Conservation Act 1999, the Victorian Government Flora and Fauna Guarantee Act 1988 and the New South Wales Government Biodiversity Conservation Act 2016. A national recovery plan for the species has been prepared.

Trailing hop-bush was one of eleven species selected for the Save a Species Walk campaign in April 2016. Scientists walked 300 km (190 mi) to raise money for collection of seeds to be prepared and stored at the Australian PlantBank at the Australian Botanic Garden Mount Annan.

== Use in horticulture ==
Dodonaea procumbens can be grown from seeds. However, the seeds should be pre-treated with hot water by soaking the seeds in near-boiling water for about 30 seconds and then cooled rapidly under cold running water or by scarification. Seeds are sown 3 to 5 millimeters below the surface of the soil and germinate in about 2 to 4 weeks. Plants can also be grown from cuttings.

== Population information ==
Although there are accurate data on the location and population of Dodonaea procumbens for only about 25 populations, that means they contain about 3,000 species of plants. However, it is estimated that around 50 populations of Dodonaea procumbens are growing and existing within its range. The largest population is in the Bear State Forest with about 1000 plants in western Victoria. The second largest population contains about 500 plants in the Victoria Valley. In addition, some other populations have between 100 and 200 plants. The rest of this species are just small populations, with 50 plants or less. Recent information accurately indicates the location and abundance of large and important populations of this species. Important populations are those that are recently known precisely for their distribution location and habitat, and abundance.

== Decline and threats ==
Based on the wide distribution and diversity of the species Dodonaea procumbens, it is thought that this species was once very common and widespread throughout temperate grasslands. However, as of now, the species is almost extinct in south-eastern Australia. That shows that Dodonaea procumbens populations are significantly declining in numbers when compared with previous data due to major threats, including:

- Expansion of road works (particularly widening or re-routing)

Significant increase in vehicles and other disturbances during road construction and maintenance, construction and installation of utility services by spraying herbicides to kill weeds or burn fire to avoid weed growth. That affected the habitat as well as the development of the Dodonaea procumbens population.

- Development of residential and agricultural areas

Recently, populations of Dodonaea procumbens appear to have formed on roadside openlands, where there is little competition between plant species and some soil disturbances have facilitated its germination. This species does quite well and thrives in these places. However, its long-term survival depends on future land management activities. The locations of Dodonaea procumbens were probably affected by a conversion from grazing land to agricultural land or by land reclamation for residential development.

- Intensification of grazing regimes

Large grazing of native and introduced animals is a threat and seriously affects the Dodonaea procumbens population. Animal grazing has the ability to inhibit flowering and seed development. If grazing at high levels, the plants can be depleted and killed. In addition, this species population is also threatened by grazing and trampling from herds on tourist routes or on private land.

- Weed invasion

Introduced weeds pose a threat in many sites, with high and dense coverage. At the same time, weeds have the ability to suppress the reproductive opportunities as well as the growth of Dodonaea procumbens. Environmental weeds that pose a high threat to Dodonaea procumbens include Echium plantagineum (common name is purple viper's-bugloss or Paterson's curse), Avena barbata (common name is slender wild oat), Vulpia spp. and Aira spp. in South Australia and Phalaris spp. in Victoria.

- Regimes changing of fire

Certain populations of Dodonaea procumbens grow in open geographic areas in nature such as on rocky outcrops, which are lightly affected or unaffected by the fire. In the west of Victoria, many grasslands have been affected by wildfires, but the frequency is less likely to occur recently. Fire can be important in preventing weeds from overgrowing and helping to maintain vegetation in a well-ventilated condition, which may inhibit growth in Dodonaea procumbens.

== Activities to protect Dodonaea procumbens ==
Develop a strategy to conserve and restore populations of Dodonaea procumbens, including habitat restoration and management in combination with research on the essential ecological and physiological requirements of the species. It is essential to use knowledge to implement on-site technical activities to better protect and promote population regeneration.

In order to achieve this, restoration activities need to be done, such as gathering basic data about the Dodonaea procumbens population to assess its condition and habitat and from there come up with solutions to protect the populations aimed at increasing the population of the species. Activities include:

- Do not conduct road construction activities including widening, rehabilitating, or upgrading roads where Dodonaea procumbens populations are located. At the same time, do not improve grassland and other land use activities that may affect the habitat of Dodonaea procumbens populations.
- Do not exploit, build or develop residential and agricultural areas in the lands where the Dodonaea procumbens exist in order to prevent the risk of their population decline. In addition, legally protect those sites, maintain habitats and liaise with land management agencies including private landowners to work together to protect this population.
- Do not increase grazing pressure on sites where Dodonaea procumbens exist - reduce grazing pressure if possible.
- Carry out weed control in and near the Dodonaea procumbens population as well as species that have a risk of adversely affecting the growth of this population, paying attention to only spraying or digging the target weeds. Build fences to protect the areas where populations live.
- Mark and localize Dodonaea procumbens’ potential locations and habitats on the map for protection planning.
- Search for known habitats or potential habitats of the population to better identify distribution sites and the growing size of the population.
- Study and understand the relationship between Dodonaea procumbens and related flora and its response to life processes in that environment. These are directly related to the biological function of the species and therefore play an important role in the restoration of the ecosystem for the population.
