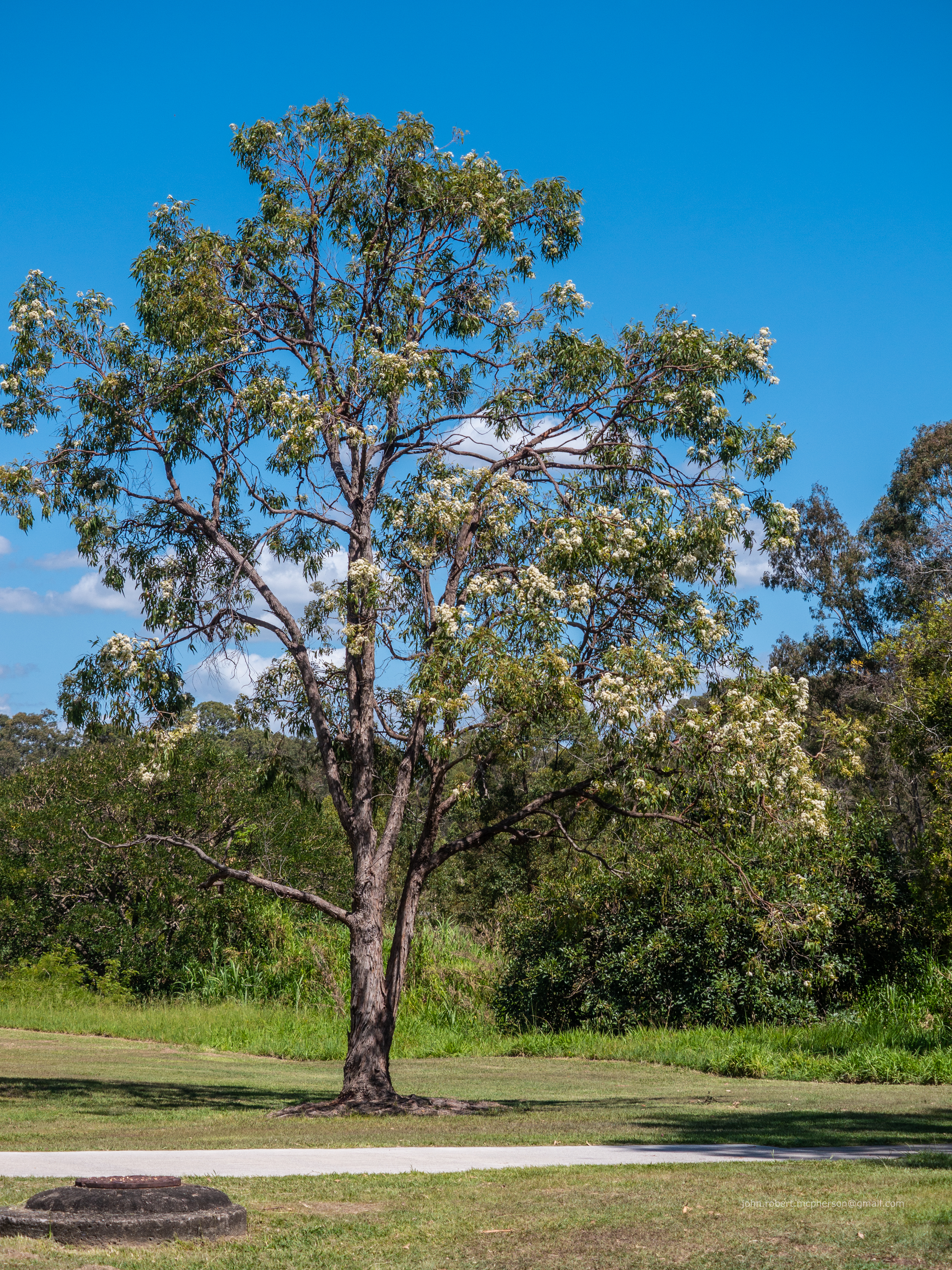

Conservation status
- Least Concern (IUCN 3.1)

Scientific classification
- Kingdom: Plantae
- Clade: Tracheophytes
- Clade: Angiosperms
- Clade: Eudicots
- Clade: Rosids
- Order: Myrtales
- Family: Myrtaceae
- Genus: Angophora
- Species: A. woodsiana

Binomial name
- Angophora woodsiana F.M.Bailey
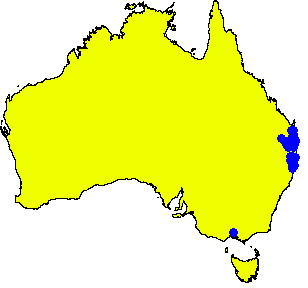
- Occurrence data from AVH

Synonyms
- Angophora floribunda var. woodsiana (F.M.Bailey) Domin; Angophora intermedia var. woodsiana (F.M.Bailey) F.M.Bailey; Angophora lanceolata var. woodsiana (F.M.Bailey) Maiden; Eucalyptus woodsiana (F.M.Bailey) Brooker

= Angophora woodsiana =

Species of tree

Angophora woodsiana, commonly known as smudgee, is a species of small to medium-sized tree that is endemic to eastern Australia. It has rough bark on the trunk and branches, lance-shaped or curved adult leaves, flower buds in groups of three or seven, white or creamy white flowers and ribbed, cup-shaped fruit.

== Description ==
Angophora woodsiana is a tree that typically grows to a height of 20 m (66 ft) and forms a lignotuber. It has rough, fibrous grey or brownish bark on the trunk and branches. Young plants and coppice regrowth have egg-shaped to lance-shaped leaves that are 55–100 mm (2.2–3.9 in) long and 20–30 mm (0.8–1.2 in) wide and arranged in opposite pairs. Adult leaves are also arranged in opposite pairs, glossy green but paler on the lower surface, lance-shaped or curved, 75–170 mm (3.0–6.7 in) long and 17–45 mm (0.7–1.8 in) wide, tapering to a petiole 10–20 mm (0.4–0.8 in) long. The flowers are arranged on the ends of branchlets on a branched peduncle 9–32 mm (0.4–1.3 in) long, each branch of the peduncle with three or seven buds on pedicels 10–18 mm (0.4–0.7 in) long. Mature buds are globe-shaped, 6–7 mm (0.24–0.28 in) long and wide with a ribbed floral cup. The petals are white or creamy white with a green keel, 3–4 mm (0.12–0.16 in) long and wide. Flowering occurs in December and January and the fruit is a cup-shaped capsule 10–15 mm (0.4–0.6 in) long and wide with the valves enclosed in the fruit.

== Taxonomy and naming ==
Angophora woodsiana was first formally described in 1881 by Frederick Manson Bailey in the journal Proceedings of the Linnean Society of New South Wales. The specific epithet (woodsiana) honours "the Rev. J. E. Tenison-Woods, F.G.S., President of the Linnean Society, New South Wales". Genetic analysis shows it to be closely related to broad-leaved sandstone apple (Angophora robur).

== Distribution and habitat ==
Smudgee grows in sandy soil on sandstone hills in forest from Tin Can Bay in Queensland to Coffs Harbour in New South Wales and sporadically on the Darling Downs.

== Conservation status ==
This eucalypt is classified as of "least concern" in Queensland under the Queensland Government Nature Conservation Act 1992. The IUCN Red List assesses the species as Least Concern.

== Gallery ==
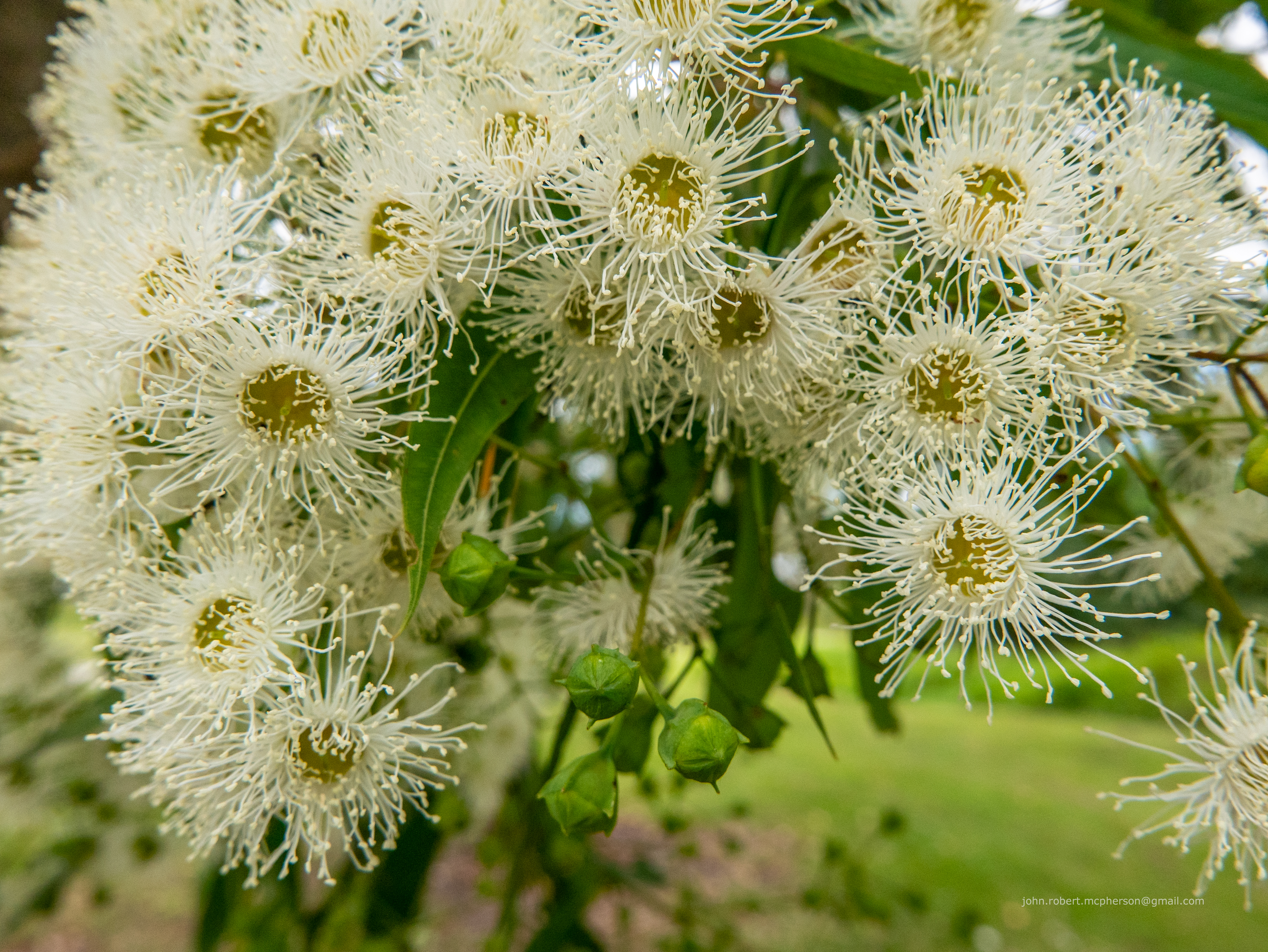
Buds and inflorescences

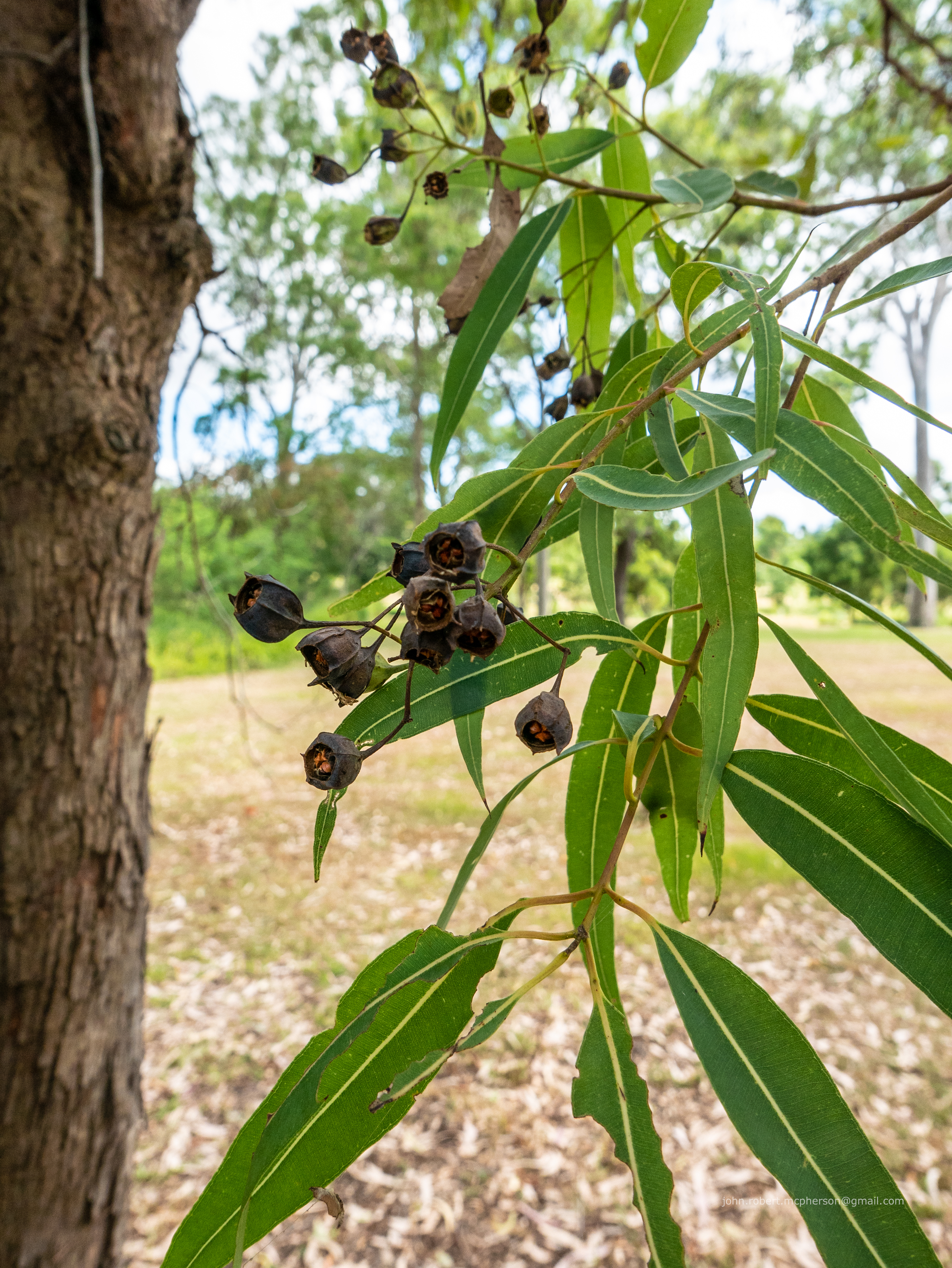
Capsules, seeds and foliage
