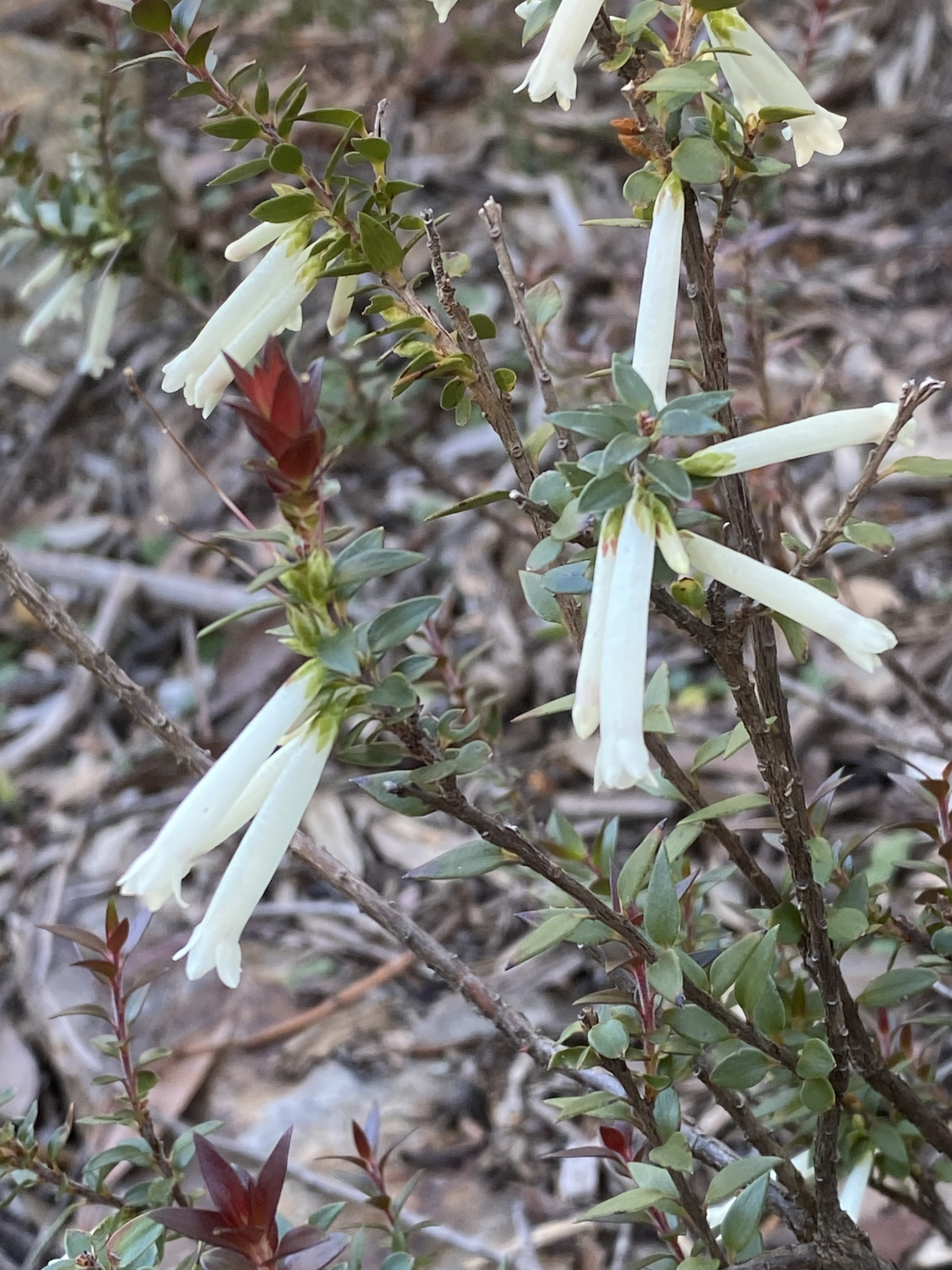
- Growing in the ANBG

Scientific classification
- Kingdom: Plantae
- Clade: Tracheophytes
- Clade: Angiosperms
- Clade: Eudicots
- Clade: Asterids
- Order: Ericales
- Family: Ericaceae
- Genus: Epacris
- Species: E. sparsa

Binomial name
- Epacris sparsa R.Br.

= Epacris sparsa =

Species of flowering plant

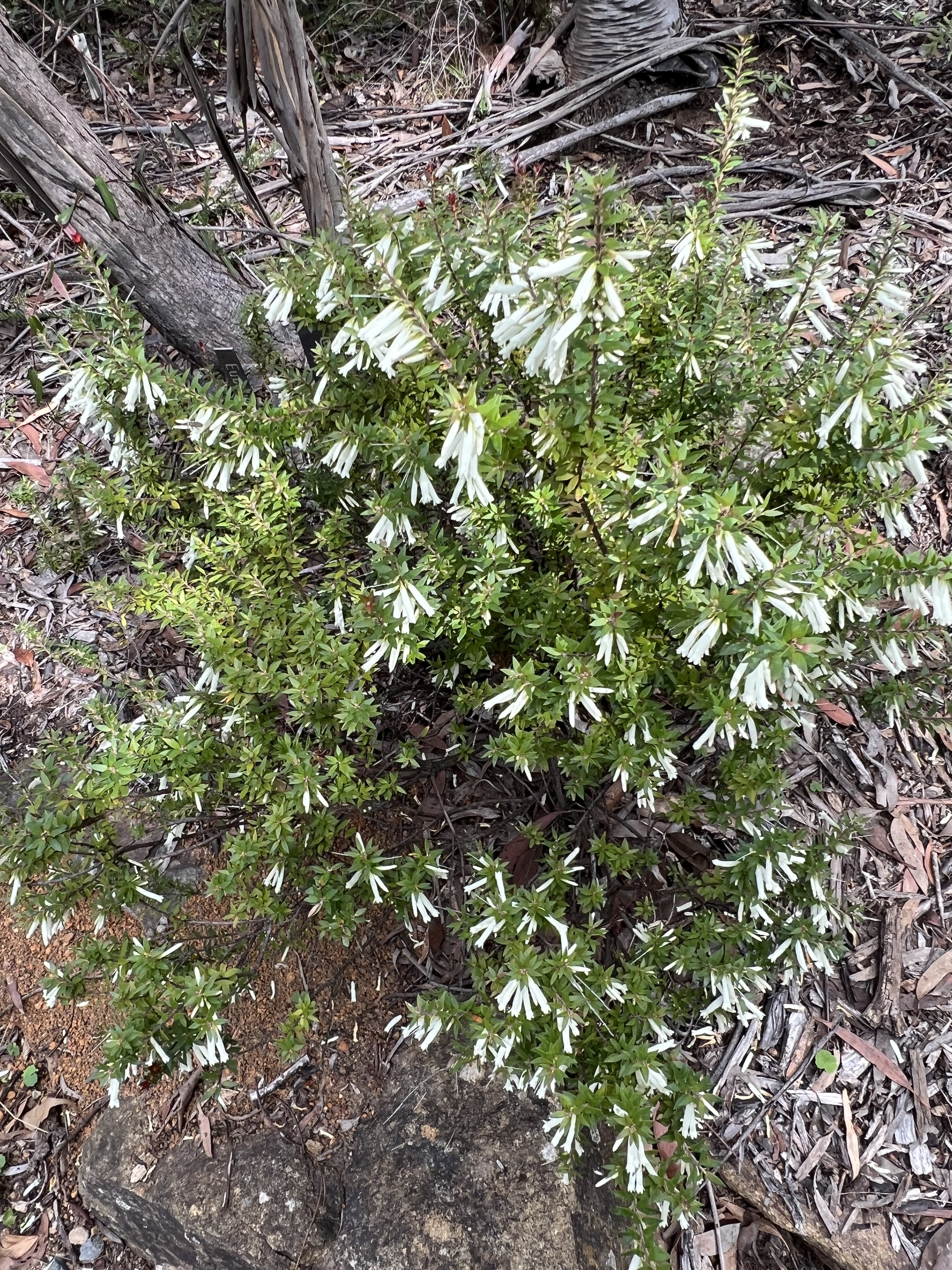
Habit

Epacris sparsa, is a small upright shrub with creamy-white flowers, elliptic to egg-shaped leaves and reddish new growth. It is endemic to New South Wales with a restricted distribution.

== Description ==
Epacris sparsa is an upright shrub 60–90 cm (24–35 in) high that forms a lignotuber. The brown branchlets are covered in fine, soft, short hairs and the new growth a reddish colour. The leaves are more or less upright, evenly spaced, elliptic to egg-shaped, 11.2–17.0 mm (0.44–0.67 in) long, 3.0–3.8 mm (0.12–0.15 in) wide, base wedge-shaped, smooth with slightly thicker flat margins, sharp apex and wide prominent leaf scars where leaves have fallen off. The petiole is 1.5–2 mm (0.059–0.079 in) long and has small, rough, hard hairs. The creamy white tubular flowers are borne singly in the upper leaf axils, either spreading or pendant, up to 19.2 mm (0.76 in) long, 4–5 mm (0.16–0.20 in) in diameter, tips of flowers have 5 lobes about 4 mm (0.16 in) long, peduncle 3.5–4.5 mm (0.14–0.18 in) long, bracts pointed and the sepals 3–3.6 mm (0.12–0.14 in) long. The fruit capsule is 1.4–1.8 mm (0.055–0.071 in) high. Flowering occurs from May to September.

== Taxonomy and naming ==
This species was first formally described in 1810 by Robert Brown and the description was published in Prodromus florae Novae Hollandiae et insulae Van-Diemen, exhibens characteres plantarum quas annis 1802-1805. The specific epithet (sparsa) is from the Latin sparsus meaning "scattered". In Alan Fairley's book "Seldom Seen -Rare Plants of Greater Sydney" he states "When Brown made the first collection, it had finished flowering, so he got the wrong impression. In fact, plants often bear many flowers".

== Distribution and habitat ==
This species has a restricted distribution only known from four populations, Faulconbridge, Grose River area, north of Richmond and Avoca Vale Reserve. It is found growing in shady, rocky, wet situations in nutrient poor clay or sandy soils. It tolerates periods of high rainfall.

== Conservation status ==
Epacris sparsa is listed as "vulnerable" under the Australian Government Environment Protection and Biodiversity Conservation Act 1999 and the New South Wales Biodiversity Conservation Act 2016.
