= Hibbertia marginata =

Conservation status
- Vulnerable (EPBC Act)

Scientific classification
- Kingdom: Plantae
- Clade: Tracheophytes
- Clade: Angiosperms
- Clade: Eudicots
- Order: Dilleniales
- Family: Dilleniaceae
- Genus: Hibbertia
- Species: H. marginata

Binomial name
- Hibbertia marginata B.J.Conn

Species of flowering plant

Hibbertia marginata, commonly known as bordered guinea flower, is a species of flowering plant in the family Dilleniaceae and is endemic to the North Coast of New South Wales. It is a spreading shrub with hairy young branches, oblong to lance-shaped leaves and yellow flowers with thirty to forty stamens and many staminodes arranged around three hairy carpels.

== Description ==
Hibbertia marginata is a spreading shrub that typically grows to a height of 50–70 cm (20–28 in) with finely hairy, wiry young branches and that forms suckers. The leaves are more or less oblong to lance-shaped, sometimes with the narrower end towards the base, 10–40 mm (0.39–1.57 in) long, 3–8 mm (0.12–0.31 in) wide on a petiole 1–2 mm (0.039–0.079 in) long. The flowers are arranged on the ends of branchlets, 20–30 mm (0.79–1.18 in) in diameter, and sessile with leaf-like bracts about 10 mm (0.39 in) long. The sepals are hairy, 15–20 mm (0.59–0.79 in) long, the outer sepals usually longer than the inner ones. The petals are yellow, egg-shaped with the narrower end towards the base, 10–15 mm (0.39–0.59 in) long with thirty to fifty stamens and many staminodes arranged around three hairy carpels, each carpel with six ovules. Flowering occurs in September and October.

== Taxonomy ==
Hibbertia marginata was first formally described in 1990 by Barry Conn in the journal Muelleria from specimens collected in 1987.

== Distribution and habitat ==
Bordered guinea flower grows in the grassy understorey of forest in the Richmond Range of north-eastern New South Wales.

== Conservation ==
This hibbertia is classified as "vulnerable" under the Australian Government Environment Protection and Biodiversity Conservation Act 1999 and the New South Wales Government Biodiversity Conservation Act 2016. The main threats to the species are land clearing, road maintenance and inappropriate fire regimes. This was one of eleven species selected for the Save a Species Walk campaign in April 2016; scientists walked 300 km to raise money for collection of seeds to be prepared and stored at the Australian PlantBank at the Australian Botanic Garden, Mount Annan.
