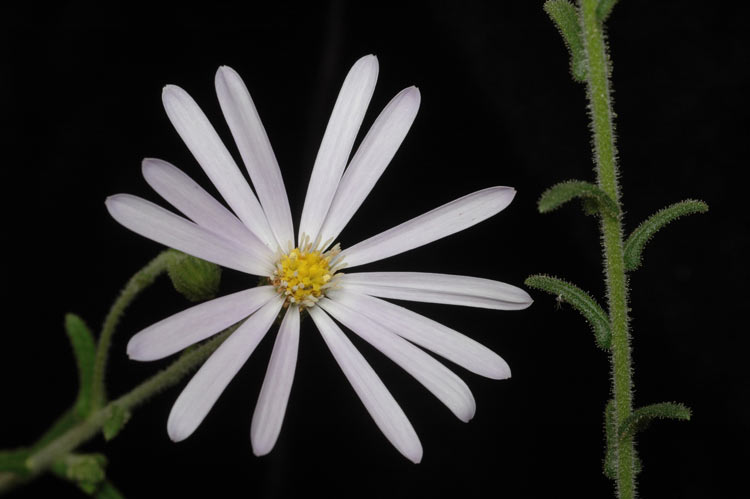

Conservation status
- Vulnerable (EPBC Act)

Scientific classification
- Kingdom: Plantae
- Clade: Tracheophytes
- Clade: Angiosperms
- Clade: Eudicots
- Clade: Asterids
- Order: Asterales
- Family: Asteraceae
- Genus: Wollemiaster; G.L.Nesom
- Species: W. cordatus

Binomial name
- Wollemiaster cordatus (Lander) G.L.Nesom

Synonyms
- Olearia cordata Lander

= Wollemiaster =

Species of shrub

Wollemiaster is a genus of flowering plants in the family Asteraceae. It includes a single species, Wollemiaster cordatus (synonym Olearia cordata), which is endemic to New South Wales. It is an aromatic slender shrub with mostly mauve to dark blue daisy-like flowers. Flowers appear in clusters at the end of branches, leaves are narrow and heart-shaped near the base.

== Description ==
Wollemiaster cordatus is a shrub to 2 m (6.6 ft) high. The branchlets and leaves are thickly covered in hairs and glands that are sticky and rough. The leaves grow sparsely and alternately are 10–40 mm (0.39–1.6 in) long and 2–8 mm (0.079–0.31 in) wide and obscure veins. The leaves are narrowly egg-shaped becoming heart shaped near the base and tapering to either a sharp point or rounded. The leaf margin is entire with a rolled edge. The single flower head consists of a cluster of 10-18 mauve to dark blue daisy-like flowers are up 22–35 mm (0.87–1.4 in) in diameter on a peduncle 40 mm (1.6 in) long. The flower centre is yellow. The fruit is smooth with several long hairs. Flowers from November to February.

== Taxonomy and naming ==
Wollemiaster cordatus was first formally described by Nicholas Sèan Lander in 1975 and published in the journal Telopea. The specific epithet (cordata) is derived from the Latin word cordatus meaning "heart-shaped". In 2002 Cross et al. showed that Olearia as then described was polyphyletic, and in 2020 Guy L. Nesom described the new monotypic genus Wollemiaster to contain the species, renamed W. cordatus.

== Distribution and habitat ==
This species is endemic to New South Wales in sparsely scattered locations from Wisemans Ferry to Wollombi mostly in National Parks. Grows in open scrubland on sandstone ridges in dry sclerophyll forest.

== Conservation status ==
Wollemiaster cordatus (as Olearia cordata) is listed as "vulnerable" in New South Wales by the Office of Environment and Heritage and under the Australian Government EPBC Act.
