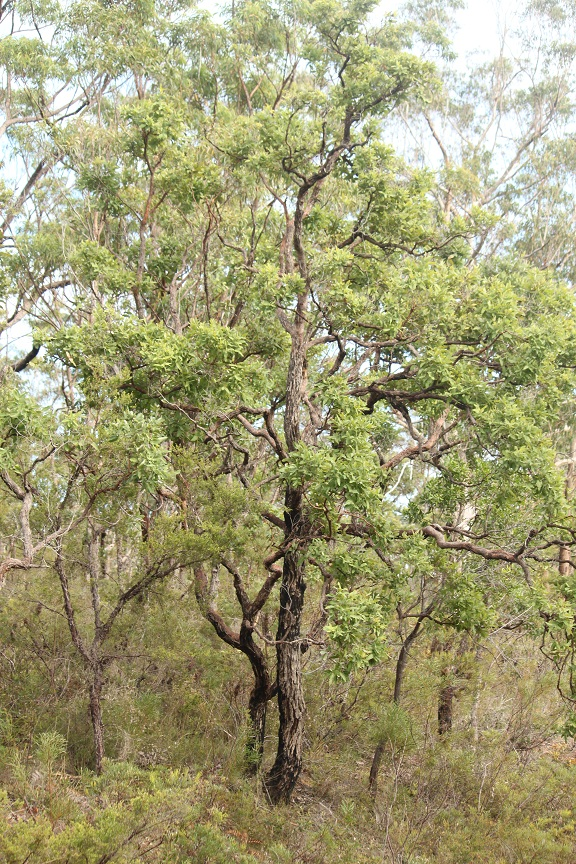
- Near Glenreagh

Conservation status
- Least Concern (IUCN 3.1)

- Vulnerable (EPBC Act)

Scientific classification
- Kingdom: Plantae
- Clade: Tracheophytes
- Clade: Angiosperms
- Clade: Eudicots
- Clade: Rosids
- Order: Myrtales
- Family: Myrtaceae
- Genus: Angophora
- Species: A. robur

Binomial name
- Angophora robur L.A.S.Johnson & K.D.Hill
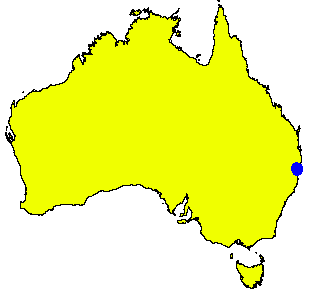
- Occurrence data from AVH

Synonyms
- Eucalyptus robur (L.A.S.Johnson & K.D.Hill) Brooker

= Angophora robur =

Sandstone rough-barked apple

Species of tree

Angophora robur, commonly known as the sandstone rough-barked apple or the broad-leaved sandstone apple, is a species of small tree that is endemic to a small area in New South Wales. It has rough, fibrous bark on the trunk and branches, lance-shaped to egg-shaped or oblong adult leaves, flower buds in groups of three or seven, white or creamy white flowers and cup-shaped to bell-shaped fruit.

== Description ==
Angophora robur is a tree that typically grows to a height of 10 m (33 ft) and forms a lignotuber. It has rough, fibrous, greyish bark on the trunk and branches, Young plants and coppice regrowth have sessile leaves that are lance-shaped to oblong, 80–150 mm (3.1–5.9 in) long and 20–50 mm (0.8–2.0 in) wide with a stem-clasping base and arranged in opposite pairs. Adult leaves are also arranged in opposite pairs, lance-shaped to egg-shaped or oblong, paler on the lower surface, 60–180 mm (2.4–7.1 in) long, 25–60 mm (1.0–2.4 in) wide and sessile. The flower buds are arranged on the ends of branchlets on a branched peduncle 15–35 mm (0.6–1.4 in) long, each branch of the peduncle with three or seven buds on pedicels 8–23 mm (0.3–0.9 in) long. Mature buds are globe-shaped, 7–10 mm (0.3–0.4 in) long and 7–12 mm (0.3–0.5 in) long with a ribbed floral cup and white or creamy white petals with a green keel. Flowering has been observed in December and the fruit is a cup-shaped to bell-shaped capsule 12–17 mm (0.5–0.7 in) long, 12–16 mm (0.5–0.6 in) wide and longitudinally ribbed with the valves enclosed in the fruit.

== Taxonomy and naming ==
Angophora robur was first formally described in 1990 by Lawrie Johnson and Ken Hill in the journal Telopea from specimens they collected near Kremnos Creek on the Glenreagh - Grafton Road in 1984. Genetic analysis shows it to be closely related to smudgee (Angophora woodsiana).

== Distribution and habitat ==
Sandstone rough-barked apple has a limited distribution near the coast of northern New South Wales along a sandstone belt running from near Glenreagh, north-west of Coffs Harbour to Coaldale north-west of Grafton. It grows in woodland on shallow sandstone soils.

== Conservation status ==
This eucalypt is listed as "vulnerable" under the Australian Government Environment Protection and Biodiversity Conservation Act 1999 and the New South Wales Government Threatened Species Conservation Act 1995. The main threats to the species are clearing for agriculture, too-frequent fires, widening of roads and timber harvesting. The IUCN Red List assesses the species as Least concern.
