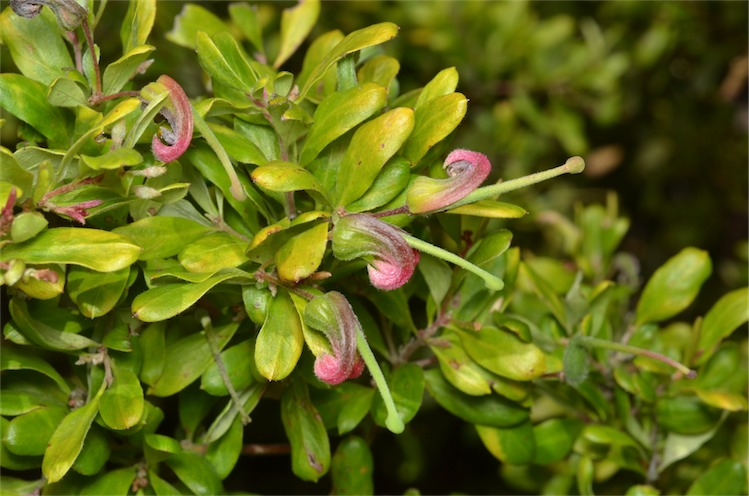
- In the Mount Annan Botanic Gardens

Conservation status
- Endangered (IUCN 3.1)

- Endangered (EPBC Act)

Scientific classification
- Kingdom: Plantae
- Clade: Embryophytes
- Clade: Tracheophytes
- Clade: Angiosperms
- Clade: Eudicots
- Order: Proteales
- Family: Proteaceae
- Genus: Grevillea
- Species: G. masonii

Binomial name
- Grevillea masonii Olde & Marriott

= Grevillea masonii =

Species of shrub endemic to Australia

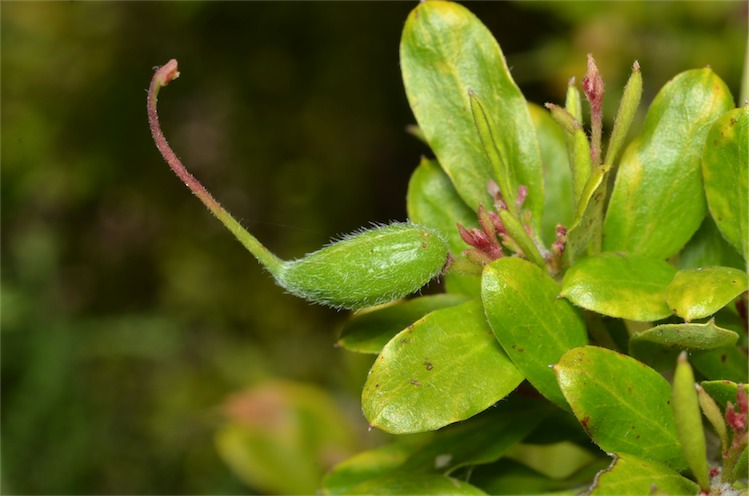
Fruit

Grevillea masonii, commonly known as Mason's grevillea, is a species of flowering plant in the family Proteaceae and is endemic to a restricted area of New South Wales. It is a low-growing shrub with egg-shaped to elliptic leaves, and red and green flowers with a green style.

== Description ==
Grevillea masonii is a shrub that typically grows to a height of 30–50 cm (12–20 in), has many stems and forms a lignotuber. The leaves are egg-shaped with the narrower end towards the base, to elliptic, 5–25 mm (0.20–0.98 in) long and 2–11 mm (0.079–0.433 in) wide, the upper surface finely granulose and the lower surface silky-hairy. The flowers are arranged clusters of 6 to 10 on a woolly-hairy rachis 1–5 mm (0.039–0.197 in) long. The flowers are red, green near the base, and woolly-hairy with a green style, the pistil 18–24 mm (0.71–0.94 in) long. Flowering occurs from July to November and the fruit is an oval to oblong follicle 11–18 mm (0.43–0.71 in) long with the curved remains of the style attached.

== Taxonomy ==
Grevillea masonii was first formally described in 1994 by Peter M. Olde and Neil R. Marriott in the journal Telopea from specimens collected near Casino in 1992. The specific epithet (masonii) honours David Mason, a plant collector from northern New South Wales.

== Distribution and habitat ==
Mason's grevillea grows in woodland and is only known from near Casino and Grafton in northern New South Wales.

== Conservation status ==
Grevillea masonii is listed as endangered under the Australian Government Environment Protection and Biodiversity Conservation Act 1999 and the New South Wales Government Biodiversity Conservation Act 2016. The main threats to the species include inappropriate fire regimes, drought, weed invasion and dieback caused by Phytophthora cinnamomi.

== Use in horticulture ==
This grevillea can be grown from seed or from cuttings and is hardy in well-drained soil in a sunny or partly shaded position.
