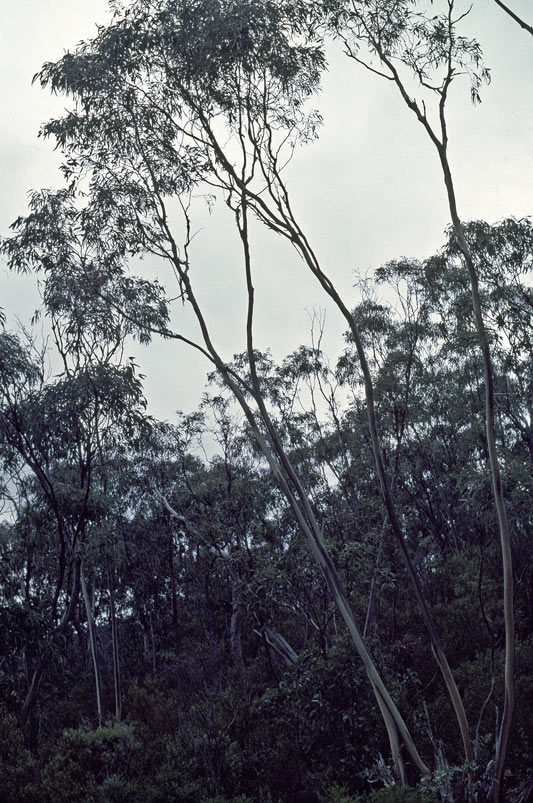
- Eucalyptus saxatilis in the Little River Gorge

Scientific classification
- Kingdom: Plantae
- Clade: Tracheophytes
- Clade: Angiosperms
- Clade: Eudicots
- Clade: Rosids
- Order: Myrtales
- Family: Myrtaceae
- Genus: Eucalyptus
- Species: E. saxatilis

Binomial name
- Eucalyptus saxatilis J.B.Kirkp. & Brooker

= Eucalyptus saxatilis =

Mount Wheeler mallee

Species of eucalyptus

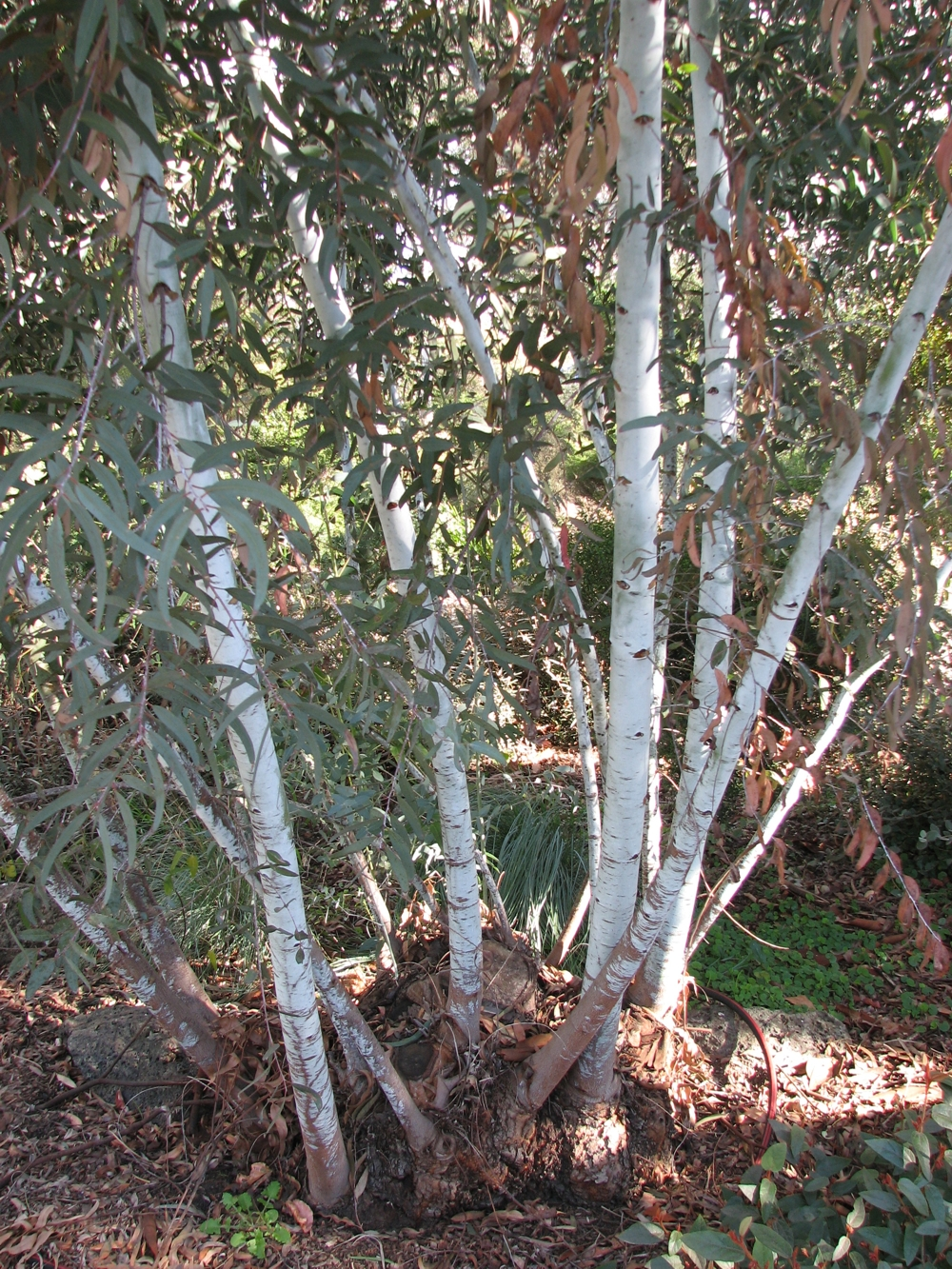
Stems and lignotuber of cultivated specimen in Burnley Gardens, Melbourne

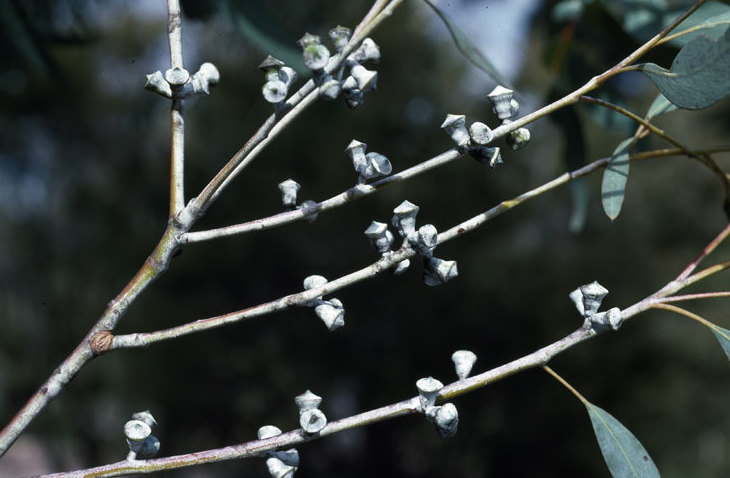
Fruit

Eucalyptus saxatilis, commonly known as the Suggan Buggan mallee or Mount Wheeler mallee, is a species of mallee or small tree that is endemic to southeastern Australia. It has smooth bark that is shed in ribbons, lance-shaped to curved adult leaves, flower buds in groups of three, white flowers and bell-shaped fruit.

== Description ==
Eucalyptus saxatilis is a tree or mallee that typically grows to a height of 5–10 m (16–33 ft) and forms a lignotuber. It has smooth, slightly powdery grey-green bark that is shed in short ribbons. Young plants and coppice regrowth have sessile, glaucous, oblong to round leaves that are 10–35 mm (0.39–1.38 in) long, 10–27 mm (0.39–1.06 in) wide and arranged in opposite pairs. Adult leaves are arranged alternately, the same shade of dull bluish or greyish green on both sides, lance-shaped to curved, 58–200 mm (2.3–7.9 in) long and 7–20 mm (0.28–0.79 in) wide, tapering to a petiole 8–20 mm (0.31–0.79 in) long. The flower buds are arranged in leaf axils on an unbranched peduncle 2–5 mm (0.079–0.197 in) long, the individual buds usually sessile. Mature buds are in contact side to side at their bases, 9–10 mm (0.35–0.39 in) long and 8–9 mm (0.31–0.35 in) wide with a flattened and beaked operculum. Flowering has been observed in March and August and the flowers are white. The fruit is a woody, bell-shaped capsule 7–11 mm (0.28–0.43 in) long and 8–14 mm (0.31–0.55 in) wide with the valves protruding slightly.

== Taxonomy and ==
Eucalyptus saxatilis was first formally described by James Barrie Kirkpatrick and Ian Brooker in Australian Forest Research in 1977 from material collected by Brooker at Little River Gorge in the Snowy River National Park in 1975. The specific epithet (saxatilis) is a Latin word meaning "dwelling or found among rocks".

== Distribution and habitat ==
Suggan Buggan mallee grows in rocky sites in a few locations near the border between far north-eastern Victoria and south-eastern New South Wales, including the Little River Gorge, Stradbroke Chasm and Mount Wheeler.

== Conservation ==
Eucalyptus saxatilis was one of eleven species selected for the Save a Species Walk campaign in April 2016; scientists walked 300 km to raise money for collection of seeds to be prepared and stored at the Australian PlantBank at the Australian Botanic Garden, Mount Annan.

== See also ==
- List of Eucalyptus species
