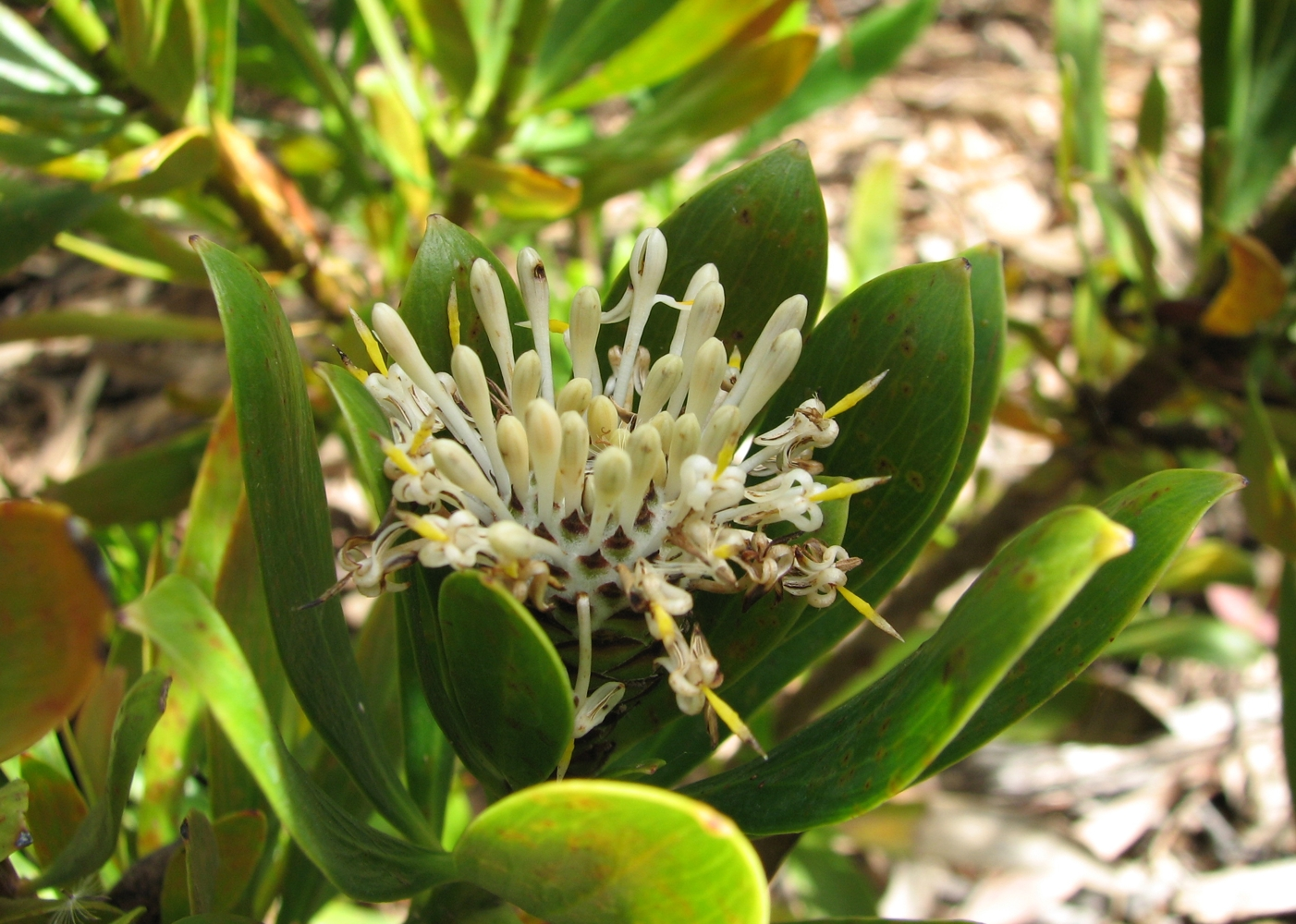
- Isopogon fletcheri in Maranoa Gardens

Conservation status
- Vulnerable (EPBC Act)

Scientific classification
- Kingdom: Plantae
- Clade: Tracheophytes
- Clade: Angiosperms
- Clade: Eudicots
- Order: Proteales
- Family: Proteaceae
- Genus: Isopogon
- Species: I. fletcheri

Binomial name
- Isopogon fletcheri F.Muell.
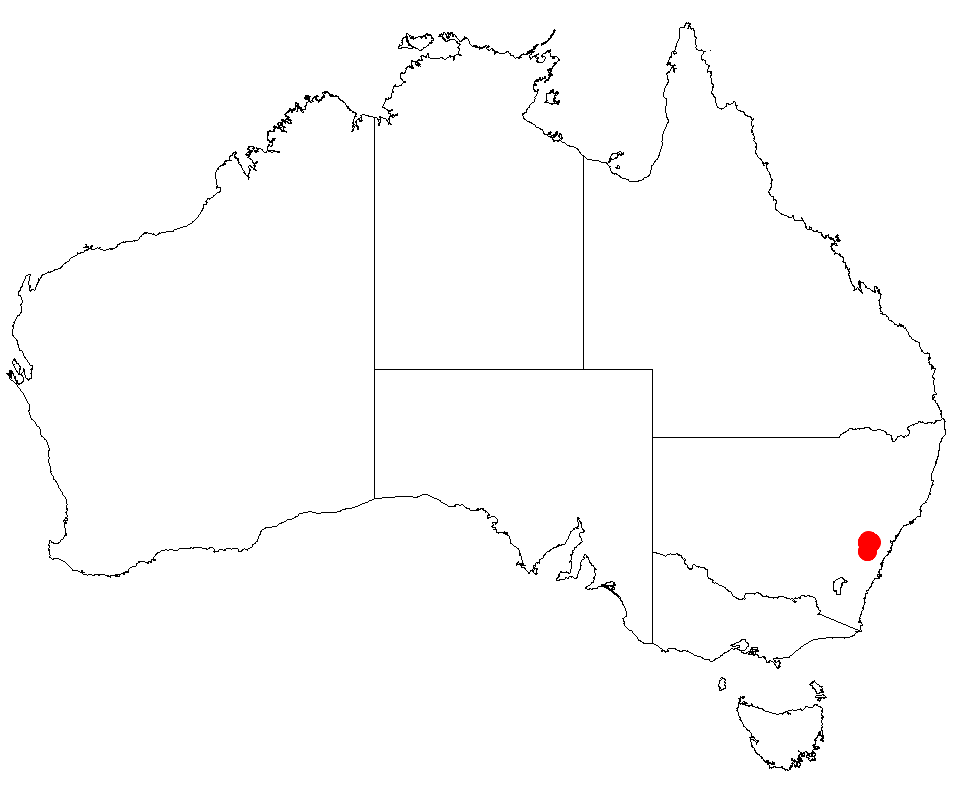
- Occurrence data from Australasian Virtual Herbarium

= Isopogon fletcheri =

Fletcher's drumsticks

Species of shrub endemic to Australia

Isopogon fletcheri, commonly known as Fletcher's drumsticks, is a species of flowering plant in the family Proteaceae and is endemic to a restricted area in the Blue Mountains of New South Wales. It is a bushy shrub with narrow egg-shaped to narrow lance-shaped leaves with the narrower end towards the base, and top-shaped to egg-shaped heads of yellowish or creamy green flowers.

== Description ==
Isopogon fletcheri is an erect, bushy shrub that typically grows to a height of 1–1.5 m (3 ft 3 in – 4 ft 11 in) and has glabrous reddish brown branchlets. Its leaves are narrow egg-shaped to narrow lance-shaped or linear with the narrower end towards the base, 40–120 mm (1.6–4.7 in) long and 5–20 mm (0.20–0.79 in) wide and more or less sessile. The flowers are arranged in top-shaped to egg-shaped, sessile heads 20–25 mm (0.79–0.98 in) long in diameter with overlapping egg-shaped involucral bracts at the base. The flowers are about 15 mm (0.59 in) long, yellowish to creamy green and glabrous. Flowering occurs from September to November and the fruit is a hairy oval nut 2–3 mm (0.079–0.118 in) long, fused with others in a more or less spherical cone up to 20 mm (0.79 in) in diameter. It is the only species on the east coast to have an entire leaf margin. Other species in this genus on the east coast have divided or textured leaves.

== Taxonomy and naming ==
Isopogon fletcheri was first formally described in 1894 by Ferdinand von Mueller in Proceedings of the Linnean Society of New South Wales Series from specimens collected by Joseph James Fletcher from Blackheath, overlooking the Grose Valley.

== Distribution and habitat ==
Fletcher's drumsticks grows in forest within the spray zone of waterfalls near sandstone cliffs in a few places near Blackheath. All of its range is contained in the Blue Mountains National Park. It is commonly found in sandstone and gravel soil.

== Conservation status ==
This isopogon is classified as "vulnerable" under the Australian Government Environment Protection and Biodiversity Conservation Act 1999 and the New South Wales Government Biodiversity Conservation Act 2016. The main threats to the species include its small population size, restricted distribution, disease caused by Phytophthora cinnamomi, disturbance due to walkers and rock climbers, and weed invasion.

== Use in horticulture ==
This species is hardy when grown in well-drained soil, using low-phosphorus fertilisers.
