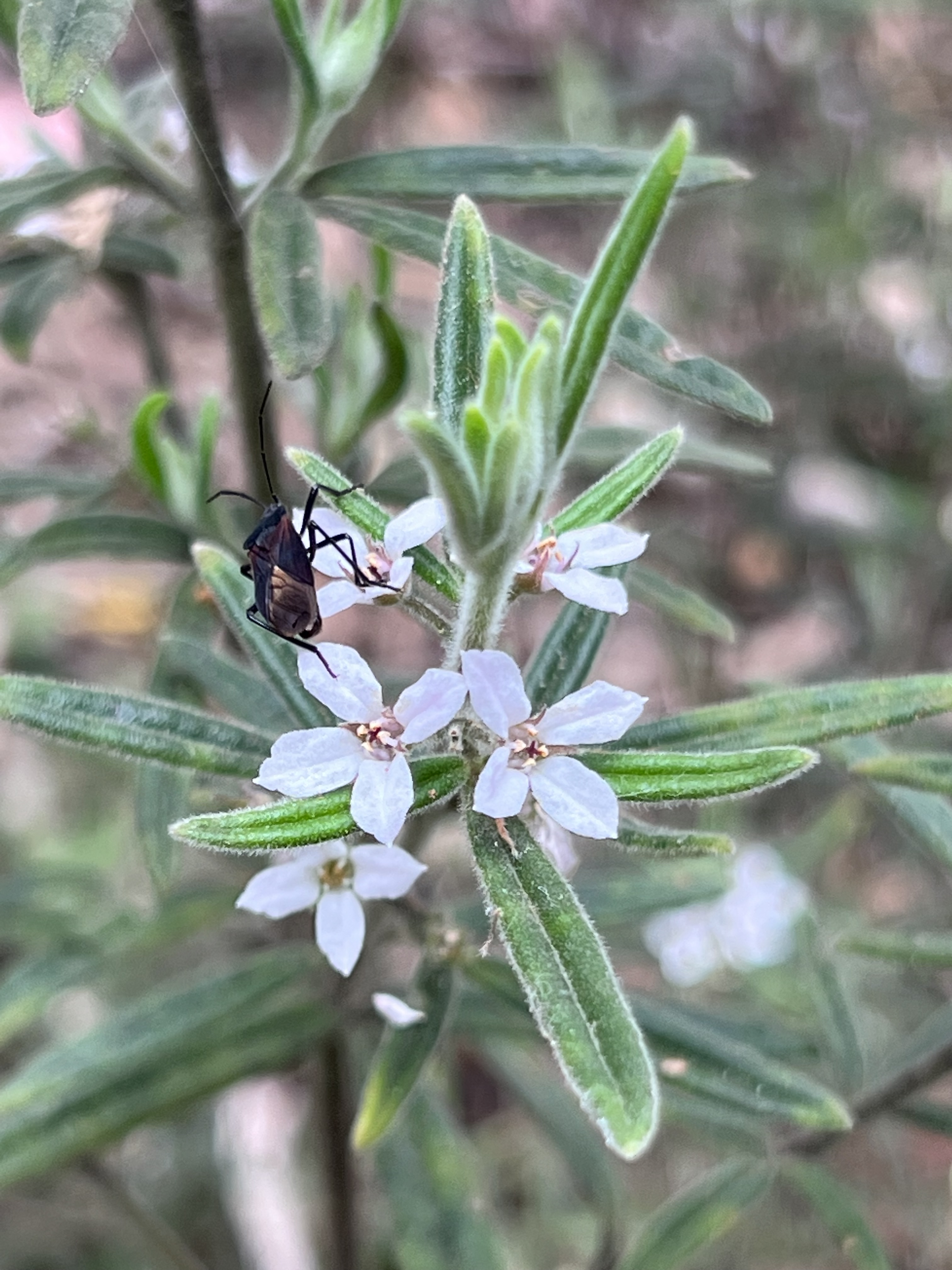

Conservation status
- Vulnerable (EPBC Act)

Scientific classification
- Kingdom: Plantae
- Clade: Tracheophytes
- Clade: Angiosperms
- Clade: Eudicots
- Clade: Rosids
- Order: Sapindales
- Family: Rutaceae
- Genus: Zieria
- Species: Z. murphyi

Binomial name
- Zieria murphyi Blakely

= Zieria murphyi =

Murphy's zieria

Species of shrub

Zieria murphyi, commonly known as Murphy's zieria, is a plant in the citrus family Rutaceae and endemic to New South Wales. It is a slender shrub with simple, or three-part leaves and between three and nine white to pale pink flowers with four petals and four stamens arranged in the leaf axils. It usually grows in sheltered places in open forest, often at the base of cliffs.

== Description ==
Zieria murphyi is a slender shrub which grows to a height of 1–2 m (3–7 ft) and has smooth branches which are velvety when young. The leaves are sometimes a single leaflet and otherwise composed of three linear to lance-shaped leaflets. The leaves have a petiole 3–10 mm (0.1–0.4 in) long and the central leaflet is 30–49 mm (1–2 in) long and 3–10 mm (0.1–0.4 in) wide. The upper surface of the leaflets is dark green and covered with soft hairs whilst the lower surface in a lighter green and covered with velvety, star-like hairs. The flowers are white to pale pink and are arranged in groups of between three and nine in leaf axils, the groups shorter than the leaves. The sepals are triangular, about 2 mm (0.08 in) long and wide and the four petals are 4–6 mm (0.16–0.24 in) long and covered with soft hairs. Flowering occurs mainly in August and September and is followed in summer by fruit which are smooth capsules, covered with soft hairs.

== Taxonomy and naming ==
Zieria murphyi was first formally described in 1940 by William Blakely and the description was published in The Australian Naturalist. The type specimen was collected by "Edward Murphy of Wingello" near Penrose. The specific epithet (murphyi) honours the collector of the type specimen.

== Distribution and habitat ==
This zieria grows in open forest in sheltered sites, often below sandstone cliffs. It occurs near Mount Tomah, Penrose and Bundanoon.

== Conservation ==
This zieria is classified as "vulnerable" under the New South Wales Threatened Species Conservation Act and the Commonwealth Government Environment Protection and Biodiversity Conservation Act 1999 (EPBC) Act. The largest populations in the Blue Mountains National Park and Morton National Park contain fewer than 1,000 individuals but the other populations are much smaller. Zieria murphyi only regenerates from seed and is therefore threatened by too frequent fires.
