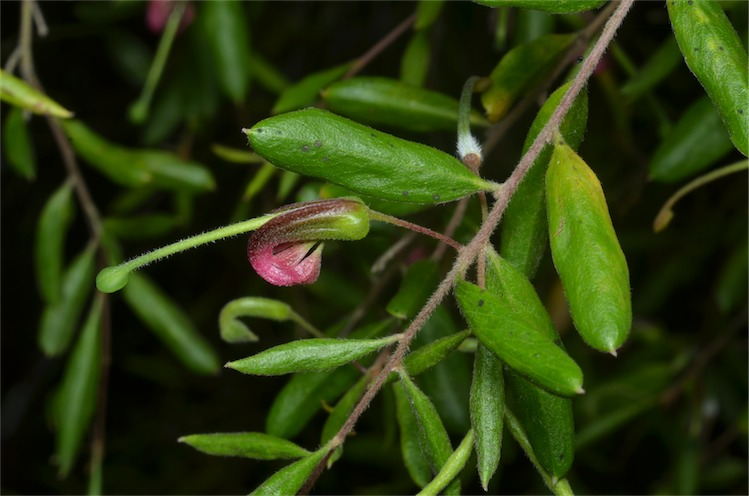
- In the Hunter Region Botanic Gardens

Conservation status
- Vulnerable (EPBC Act)

Scientific classification
- Kingdom: Plantae
- Clade: Tracheophytes
- Clade: Angiosperms
- Clade: Eudicots
- Order: Proteales
- Family: Proteaceae
- Genus: Grevillea
- Species: G. quadricauda

Binomial name
- Grevillea quadricauda Olde & Marriott

= Grevillea quadricauda =

Species of shrub endemic to Australia

Grevillea quadricauda, commonly known as four-tailed grevillea, is a species of flowering plant in the family Proteaceae and is endemic to eastern Australia. It is an erect, dense, bushy shrub with narrowly egg-shaped to elliptic leaves and small, loose clusters of green and pinkish-red flowers.

== Description ==
Grevillea quadricauda is an erect, dense, bushy shrub that typically grows 1–2 m (3 ft 3 in – 6 ft 7 in) high and wide and has purplish new growth. Its leaves are narrowly egg-shaped to narrowly lance-shaped with the narrower end towards the base or oblong to elliptic, 13–18 mm (0.51–0.71 in) long and 3–6 mm (0.12–0.24 in) wide, the upper surface with soft, shaggy hairs and the lower surface woolly-hairy. The flowers are arranged singly or in loose clusters of up to 4 on a woolly-hairy rachis 1–2 mm (0.039–0.079 in) long. The flowers are pinkish-red with a green base and style, the pistil 25–27 mm (0.98–1.06 in) long. Flowering mainly occurs from July to November and the fruit is an oval to oblong follicle 15–18 mm (0.59–0.71 in) long.

== Taxonomy ==
Grevillea quadricauda was first formally described in 1994 by Peter Olde and Neil Marriott in the journal Telopea from specimens collected in 1992. The specific epithet (quadricauda) refers to four tail-like appendages on the flowers.

== Distribution and habitat ==
Four-tailed grevillea grows in woodland and forest, usually along creeks and watercourses and is found in a few locations near Helidon in south-east Queensland and a few locations near Whiporie and Grafton in north-eastern New South Wales.

== Conservation status ==
Grevillea quadricauda is listed as "vulnerable" under the Australian Government Environment Protection and Biodiversity Conservation Act 1999 and the New South Wales Government Biodiversity Conservation Act 2016. It was one of eleven species selected for the Save a Species Walk campaign in April 2016; scientists walked 300 km to raise money for collection of seeds to be prepared and stored at the Australian Plant Bank at the Australian Botanic Garden Mount Annan.
