= List of descriptive plant species epithets (A–H) =

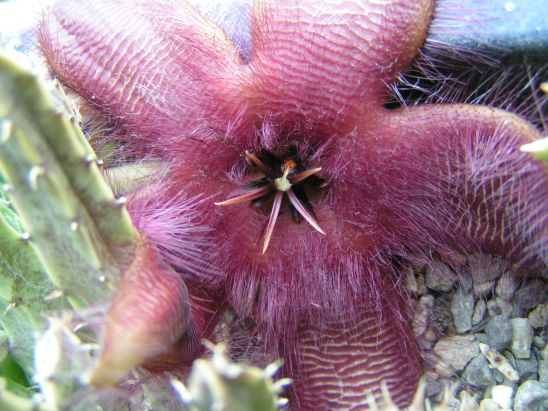
Stapelia hirsuta, the "hairy" starfish flower

Since the first printing of Carl Linnaeus's Species Plantarum in 1753, plants have been assigned one epithet or name for their species and one name for their genus, a grouping of related species. These scientific names have been catalogued in a variety of works, including Stearn's Dictionary of Plant Names for Gardeners. William Stearn (1911–2001) was one of the pre-eminent British botanists of the 20th century: a Librarian of the Royal Horticultural Society, a president of the Linnean Society and the original drafter of the International Code of Nomenclature for Cultivated Plants.

The first column below lists seed-bearing species epithets from Stearn's Dictionary, Latin for Gardeners by Lorraine Harrison, The A to Z of Plant Names by Allen Coombes, The Gardener's Botanical by Ross Bayton, and the glossary of Stearn's Botanical Latin. Epithets from proper nouns, proper adjectives, and two or more nouns are excluded, along with epithets used only in species names that are no longer widely accepted. Classical and modern meanings are provided in the third column, along with citations to Charlton T. Lewis's An Elementary Latin Dictionary. (Note: Words in the third column following "from" are related words from Classical Latin. The Latin and Latinised Greek words in the first column have masculine endings. If the genus is feminine, the -us ending generally becomes -a, -is is unchanged, and -er becomes -era, or occasionally -ra, as noted; other endings remain unchanged. For a neuter genus, -us becomes -um, -is becomes -e and -er becomes -erum, or occasionally -rum.)

== Key ==
LG = language: (L)atin or (G)reek
L = derived from Latin, or both Classical Latin and Greek (unless otherwise noted)
G = derived from Greek
H = listed by Harrison, and (except as noted) by Bayton
D = listed in Stearn's Dictionary
S = listed in Stearn's Botanical Latin
DS = listed in Stearn's Dictionary, with the word or root word listed in Botanical Latin
C = listed by Coombes

== Epithets ==
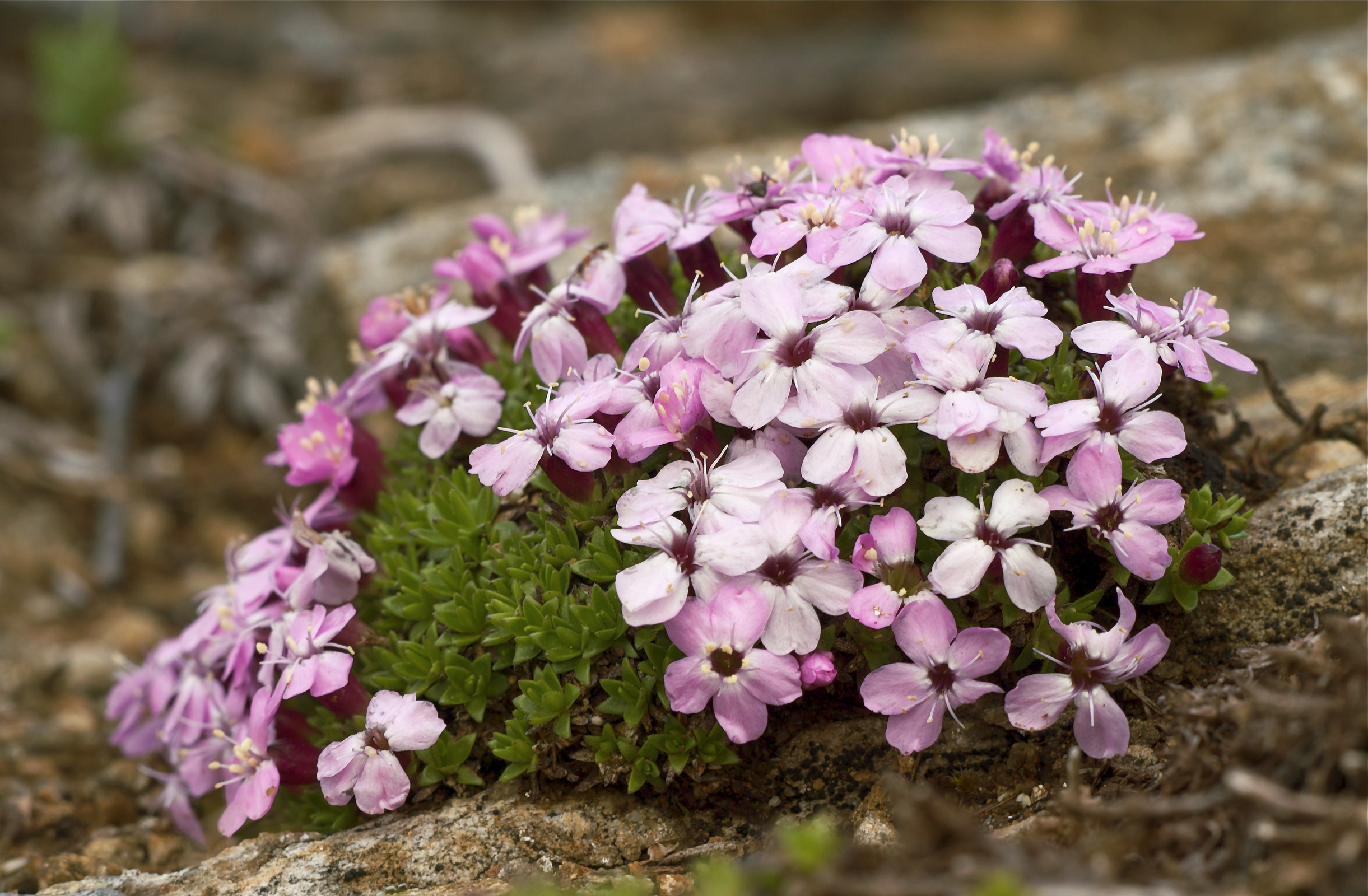
Silene acaulis

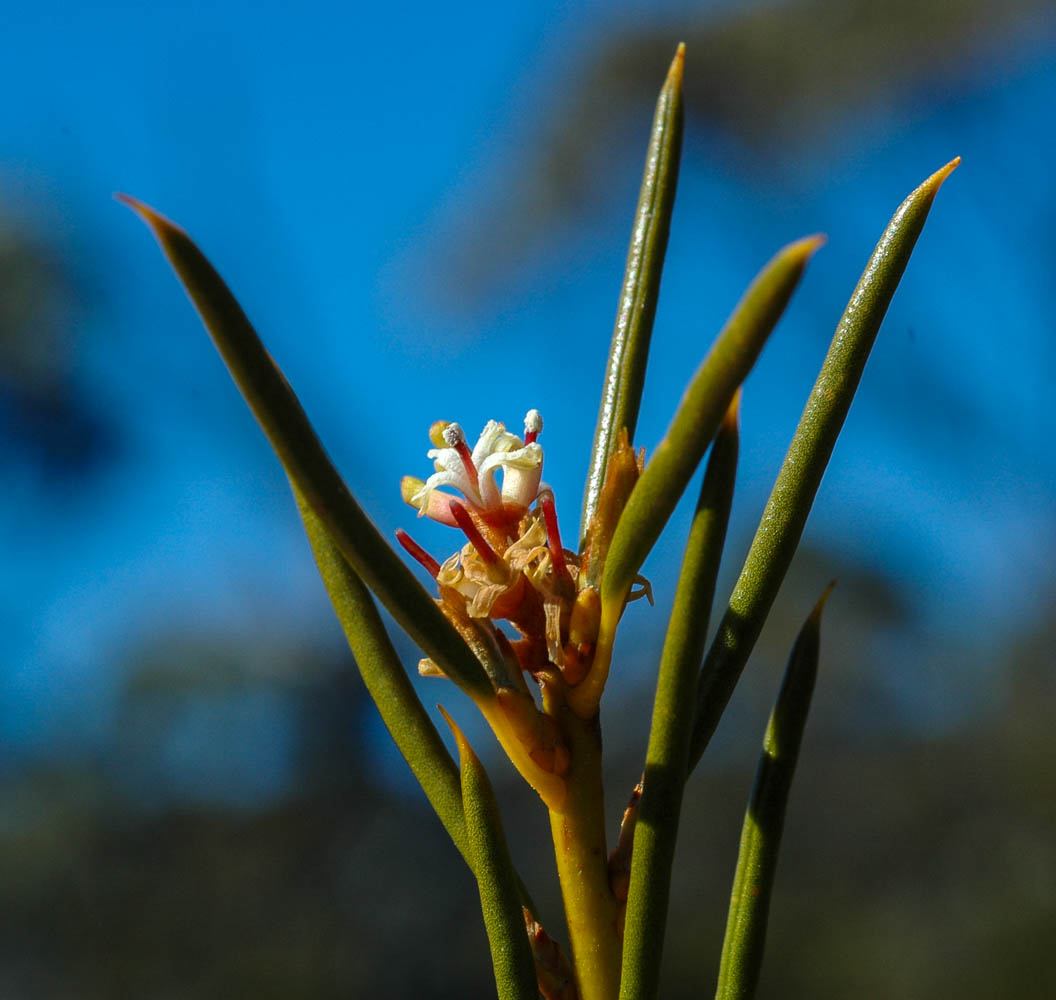
Orites acicularis

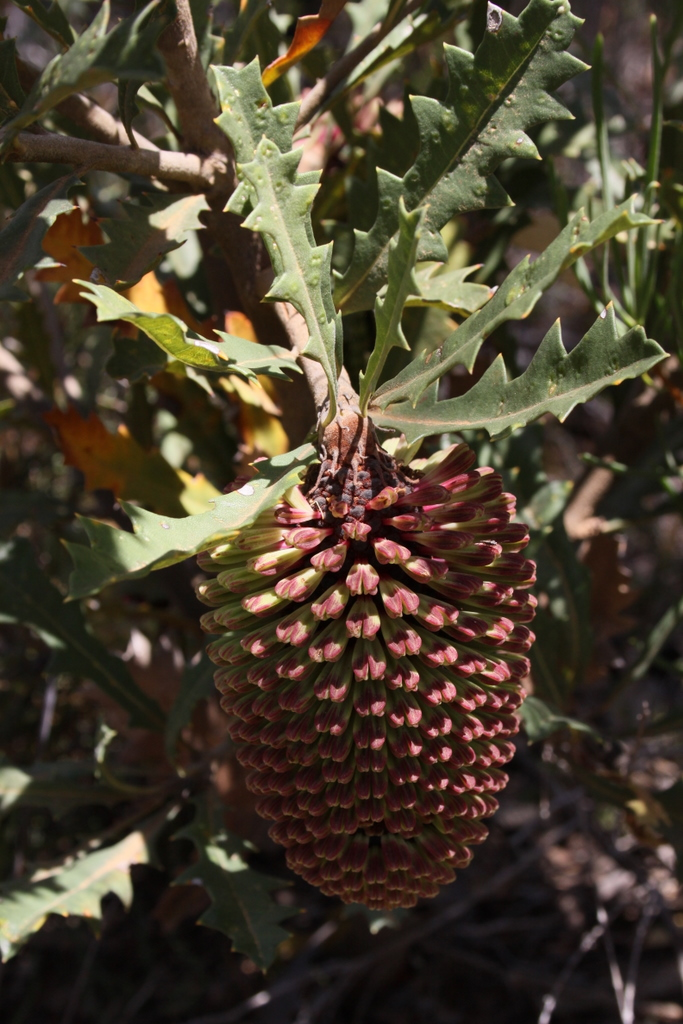
Banksia aculeata

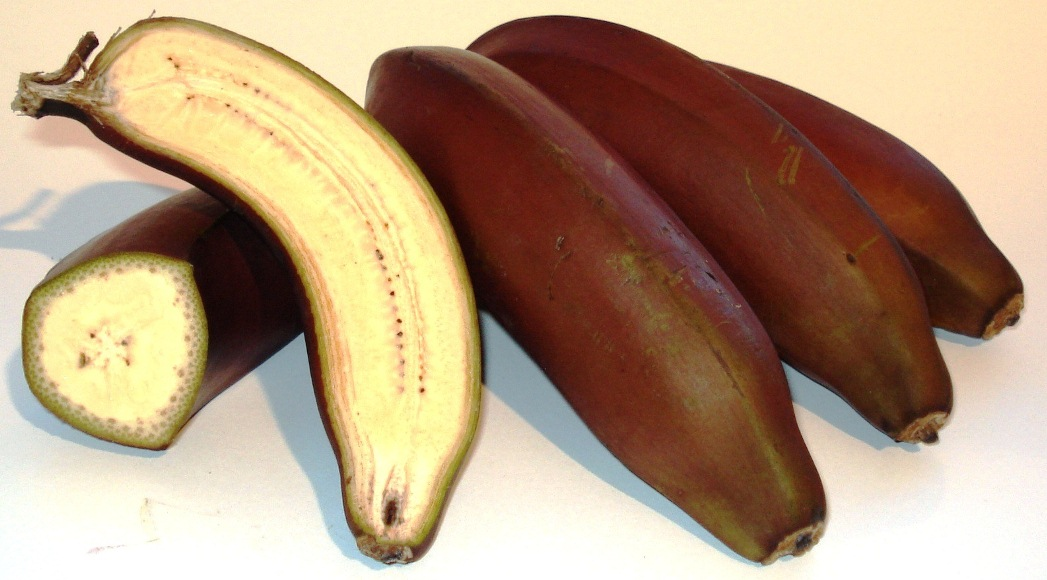
Musa acuminata

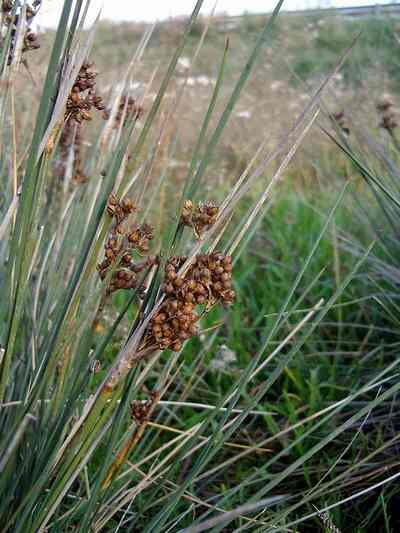
Juncus acutus

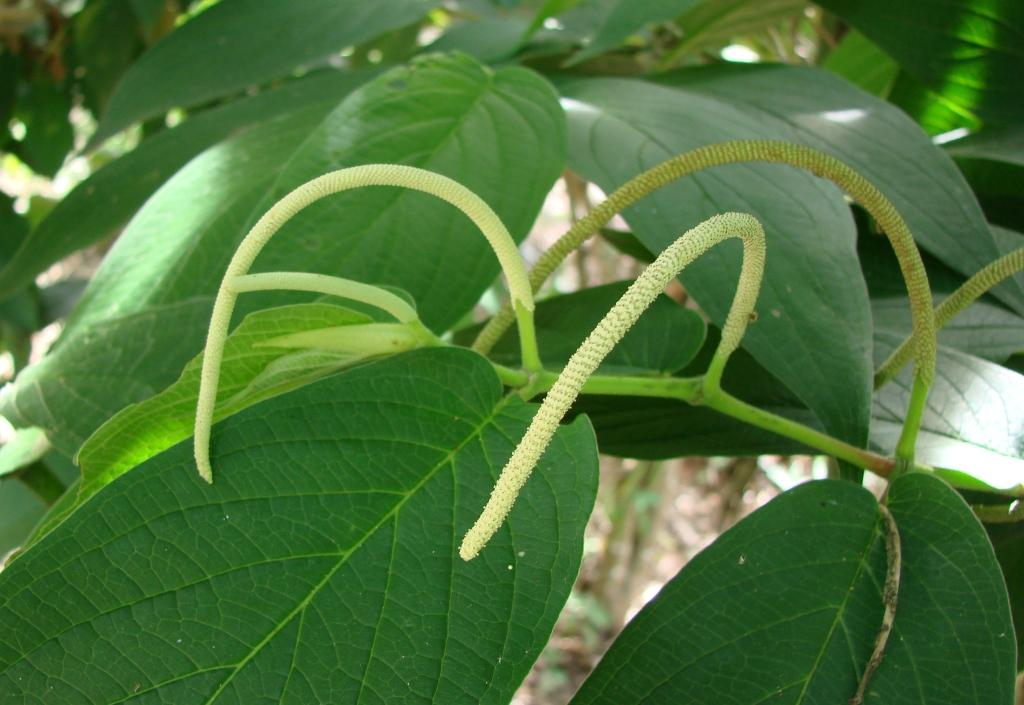
Piper aduncum

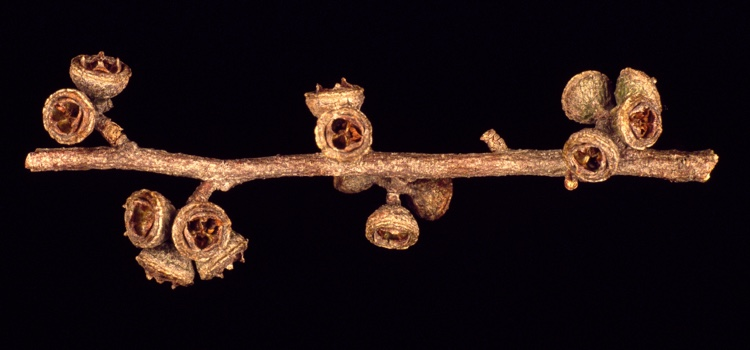
Eucalyptus aggregata

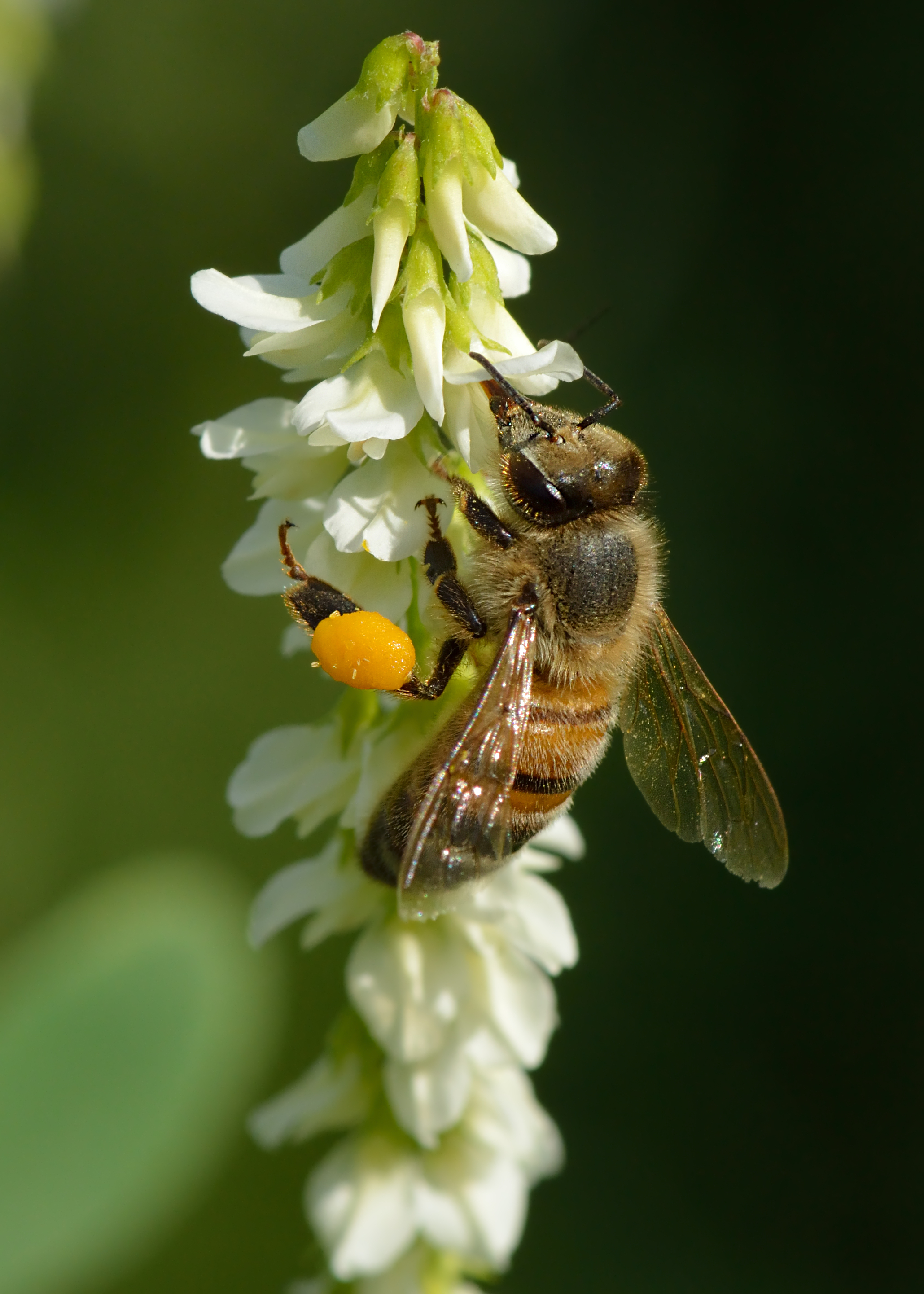
Melilotus albus and a honeybee

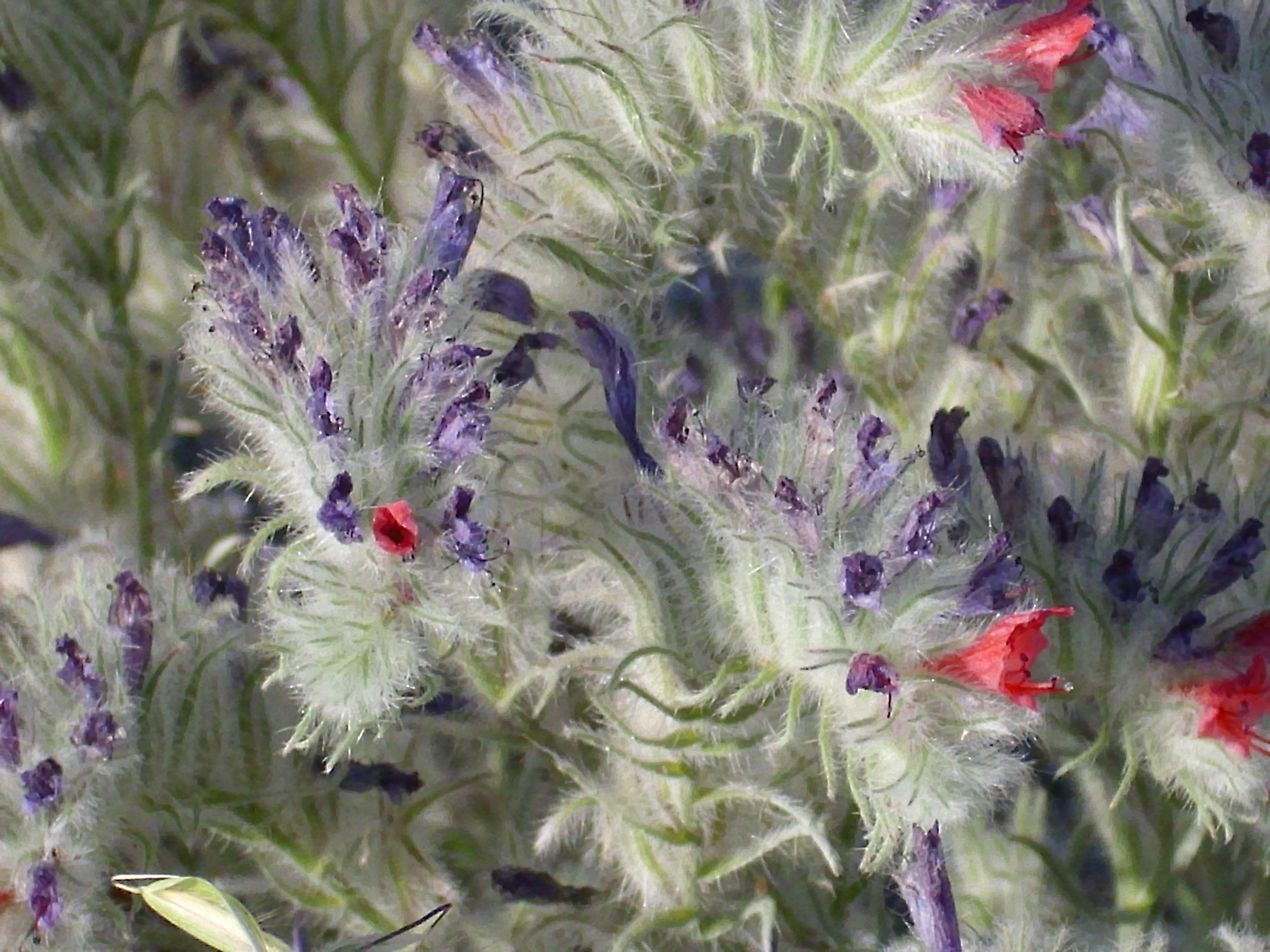
Echium albicans

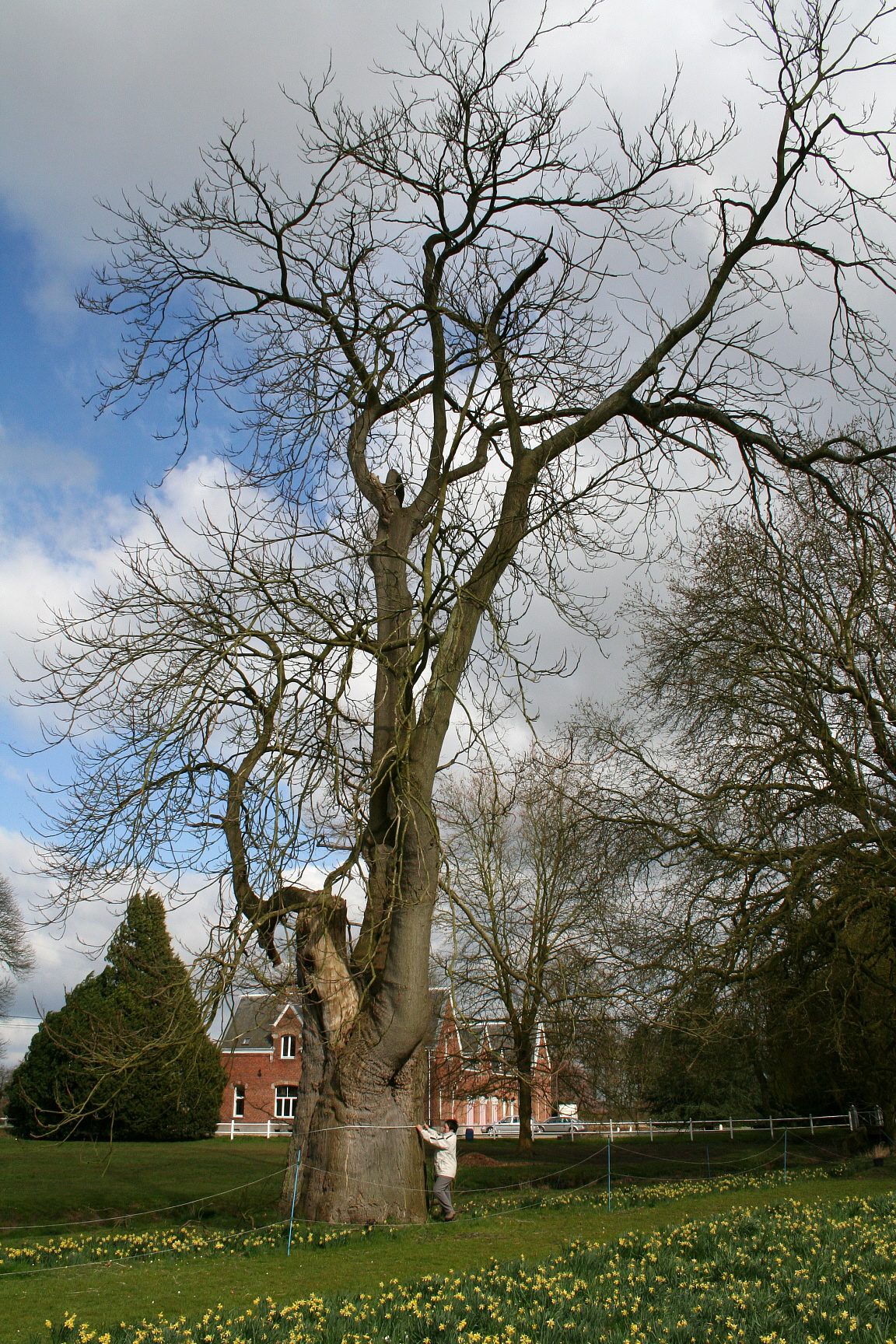
Ailanthus altissima

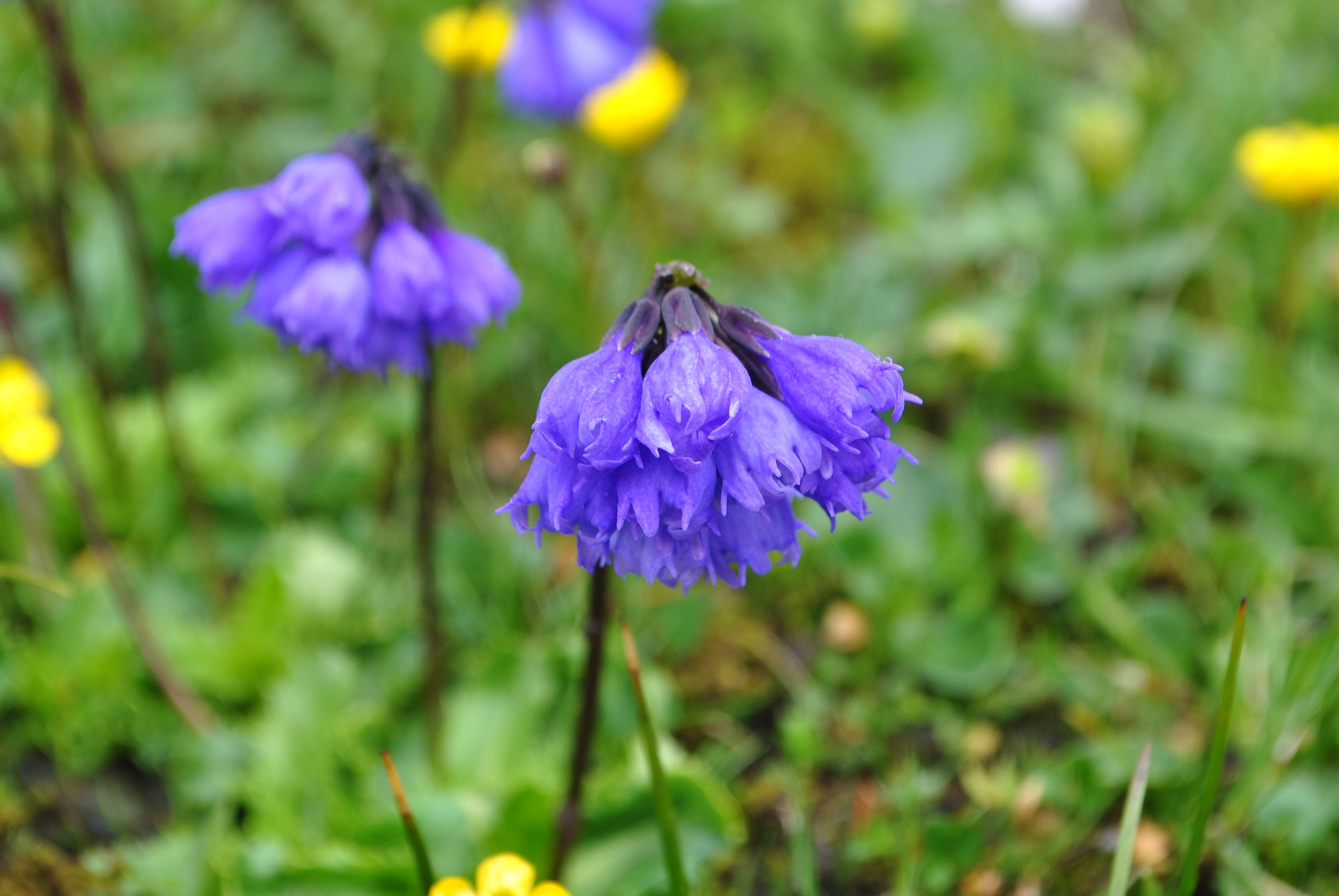
Primula amethystina

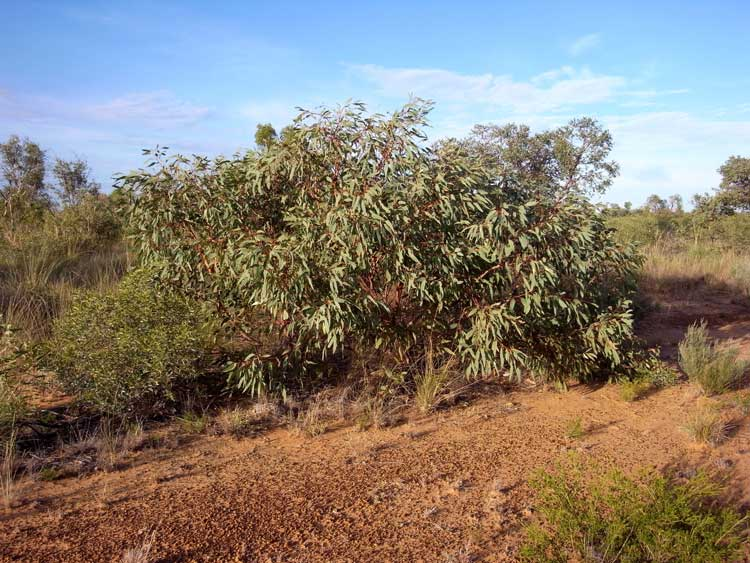
Eucalyptus ammophila

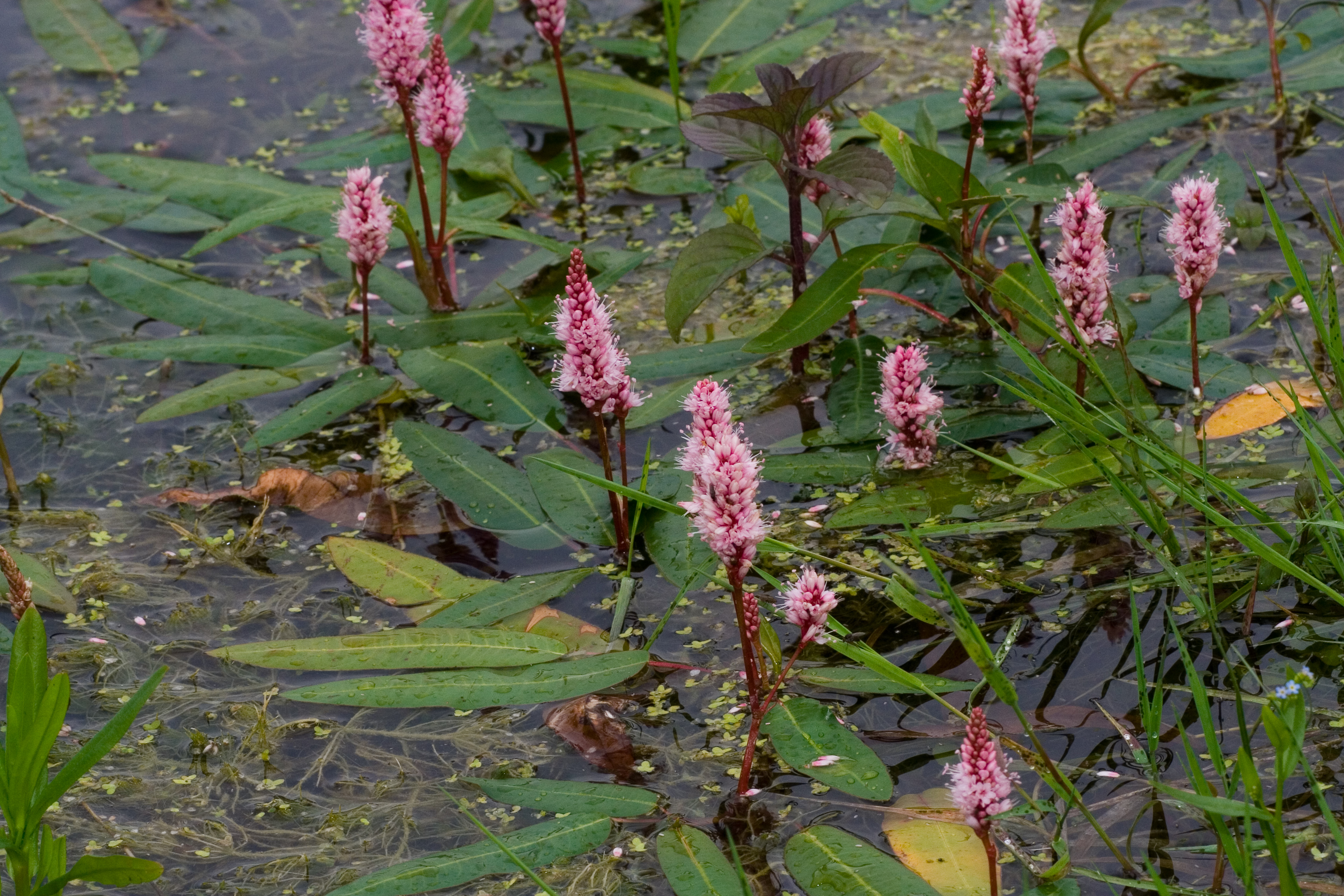
Persicaria amphibia in the water

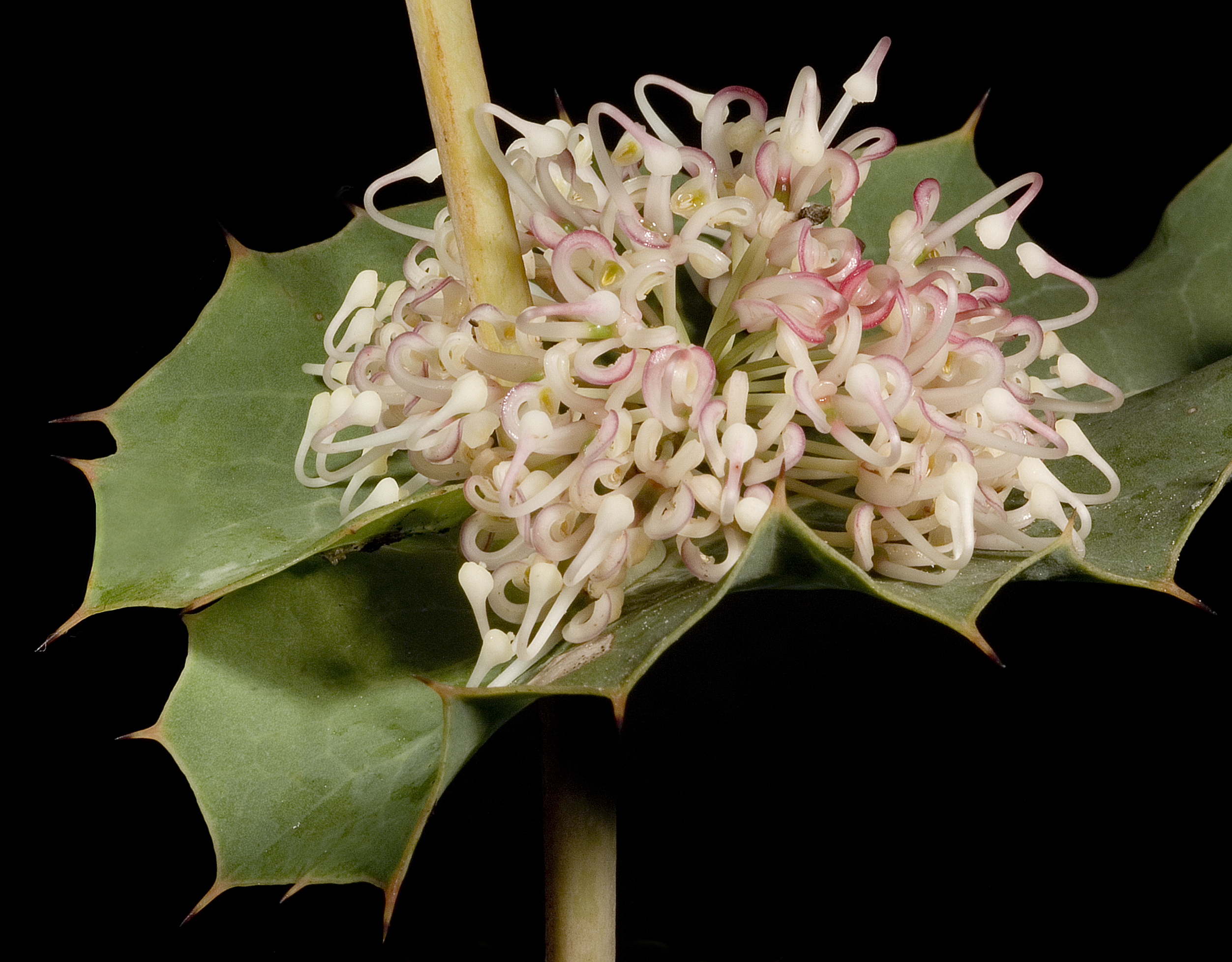
Hakea amplexicaulis

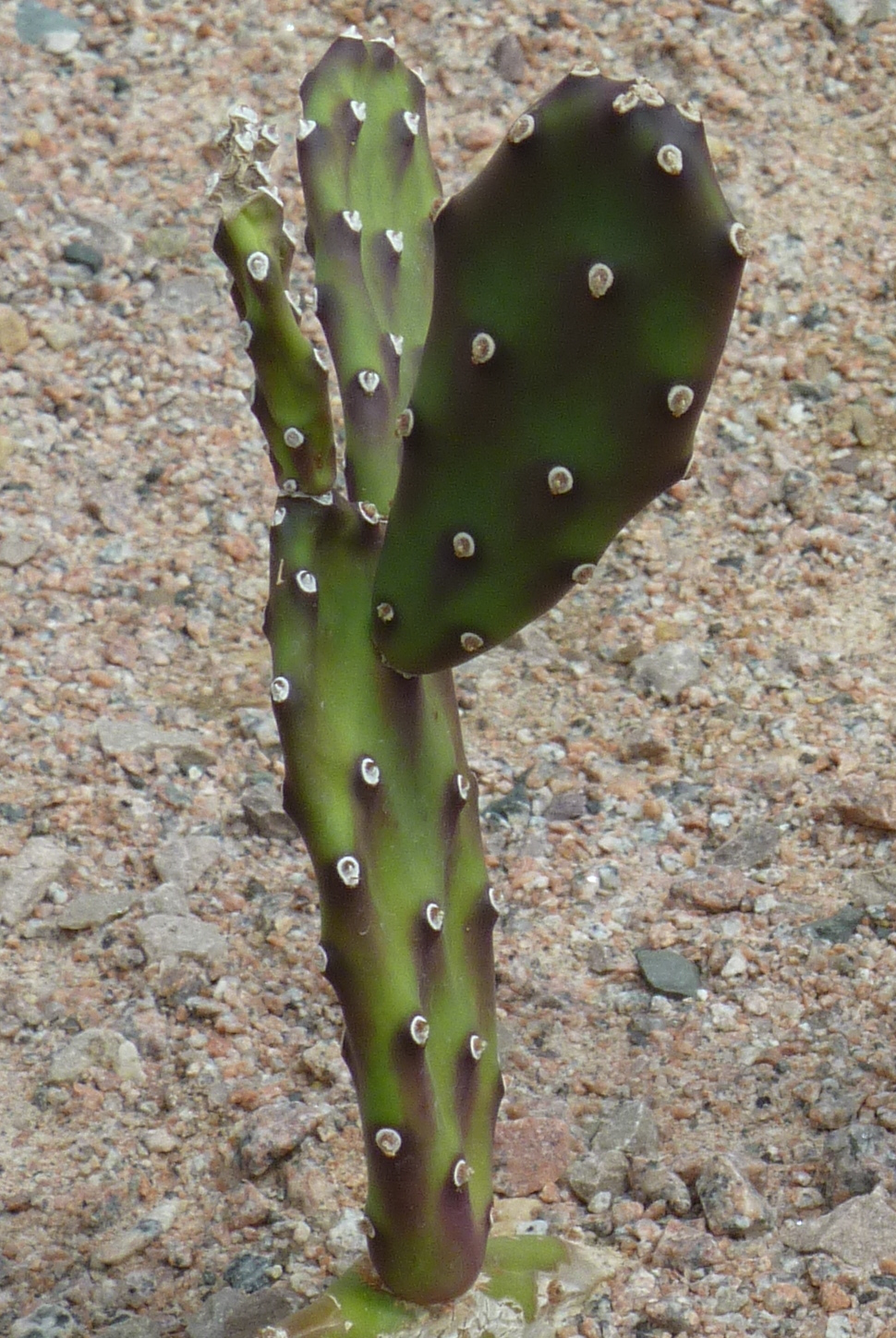
Opuntia anacantha

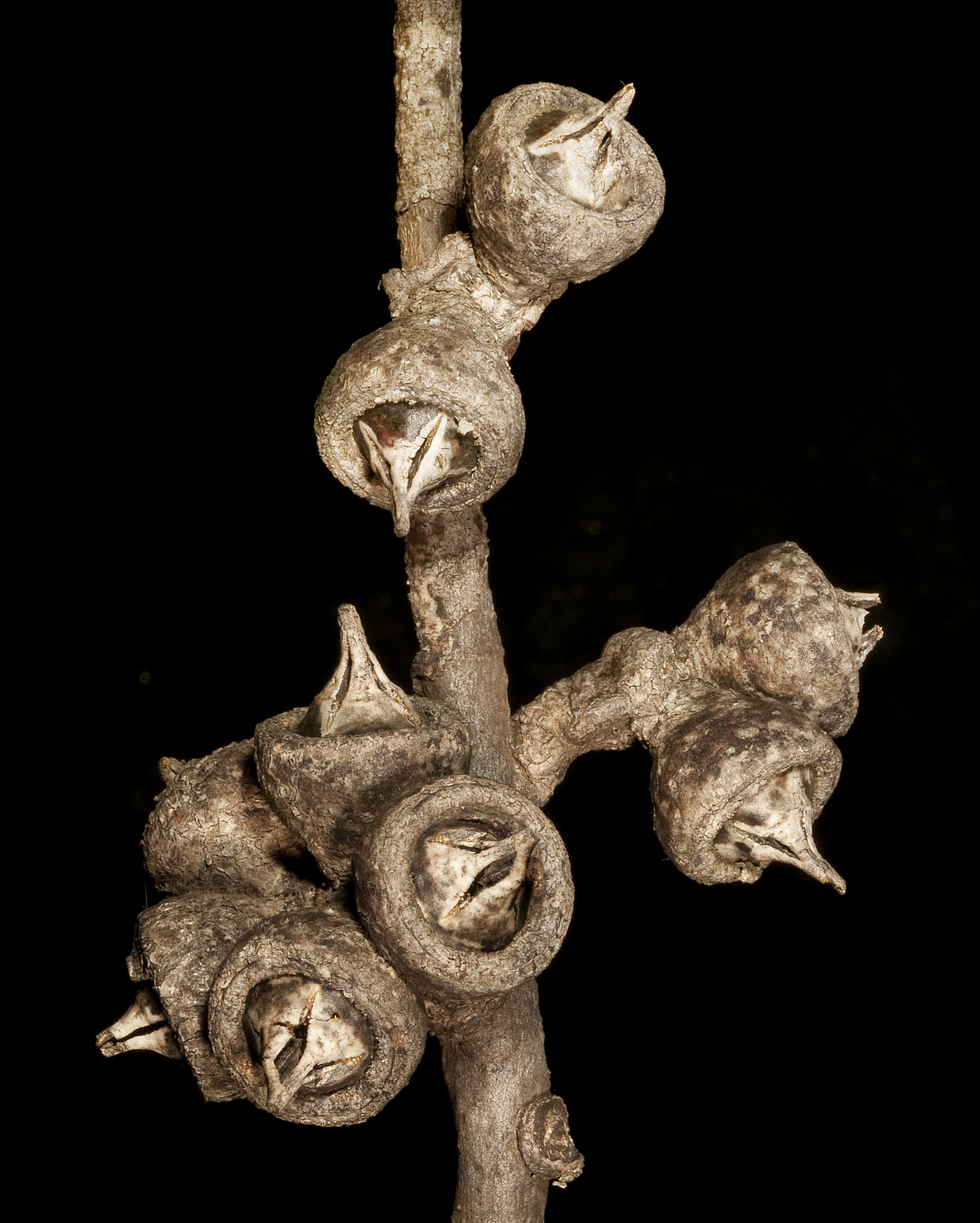
Eucalyptus annulata

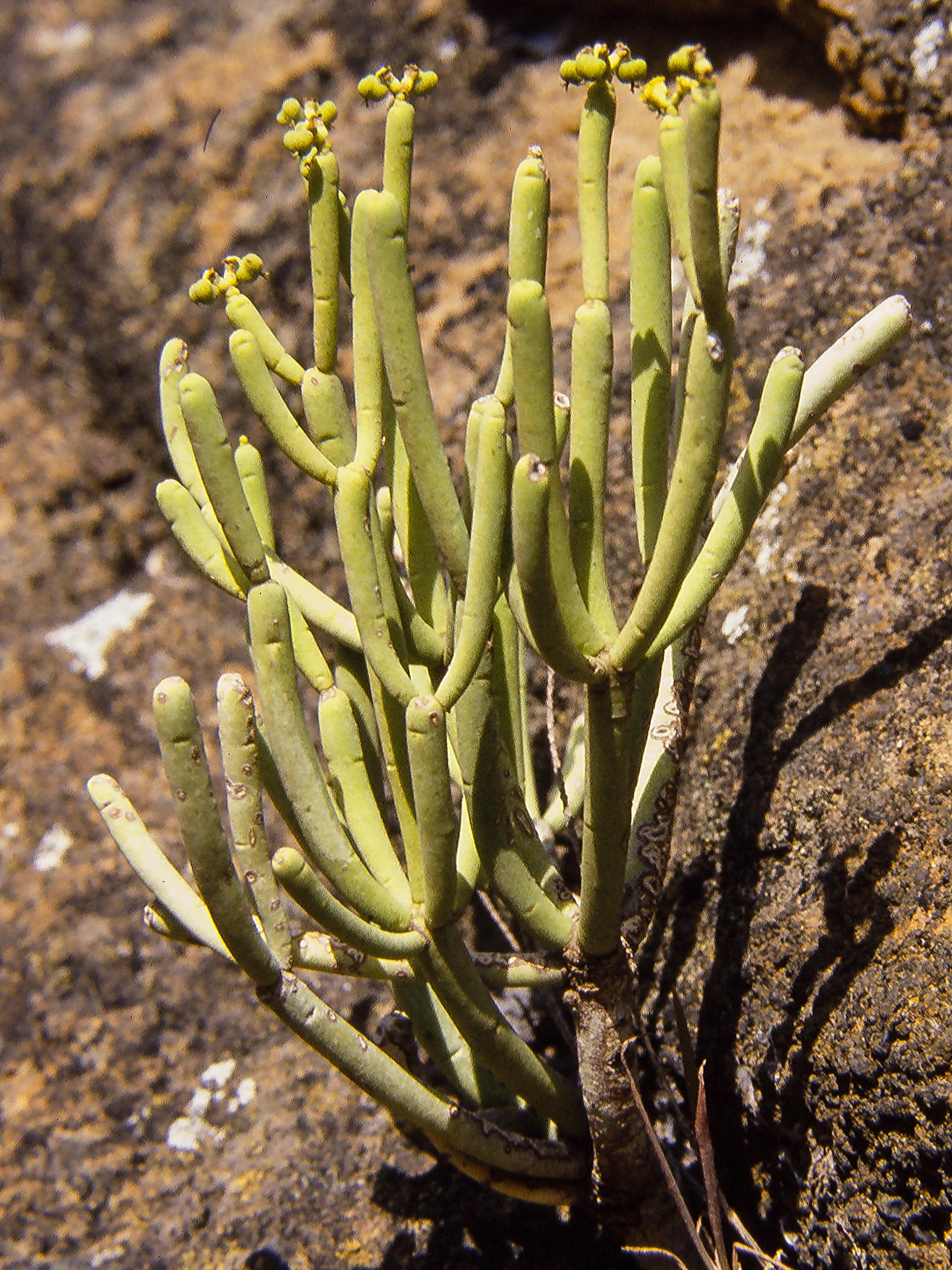
Euphorbia aphylla

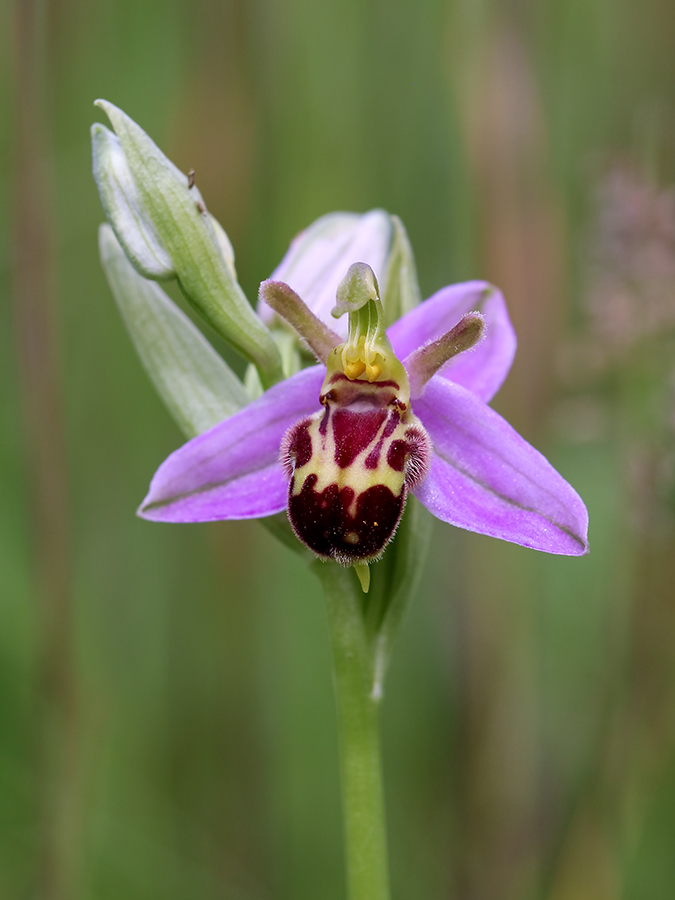
The bee-mimicking flowers of Ophrys apifera

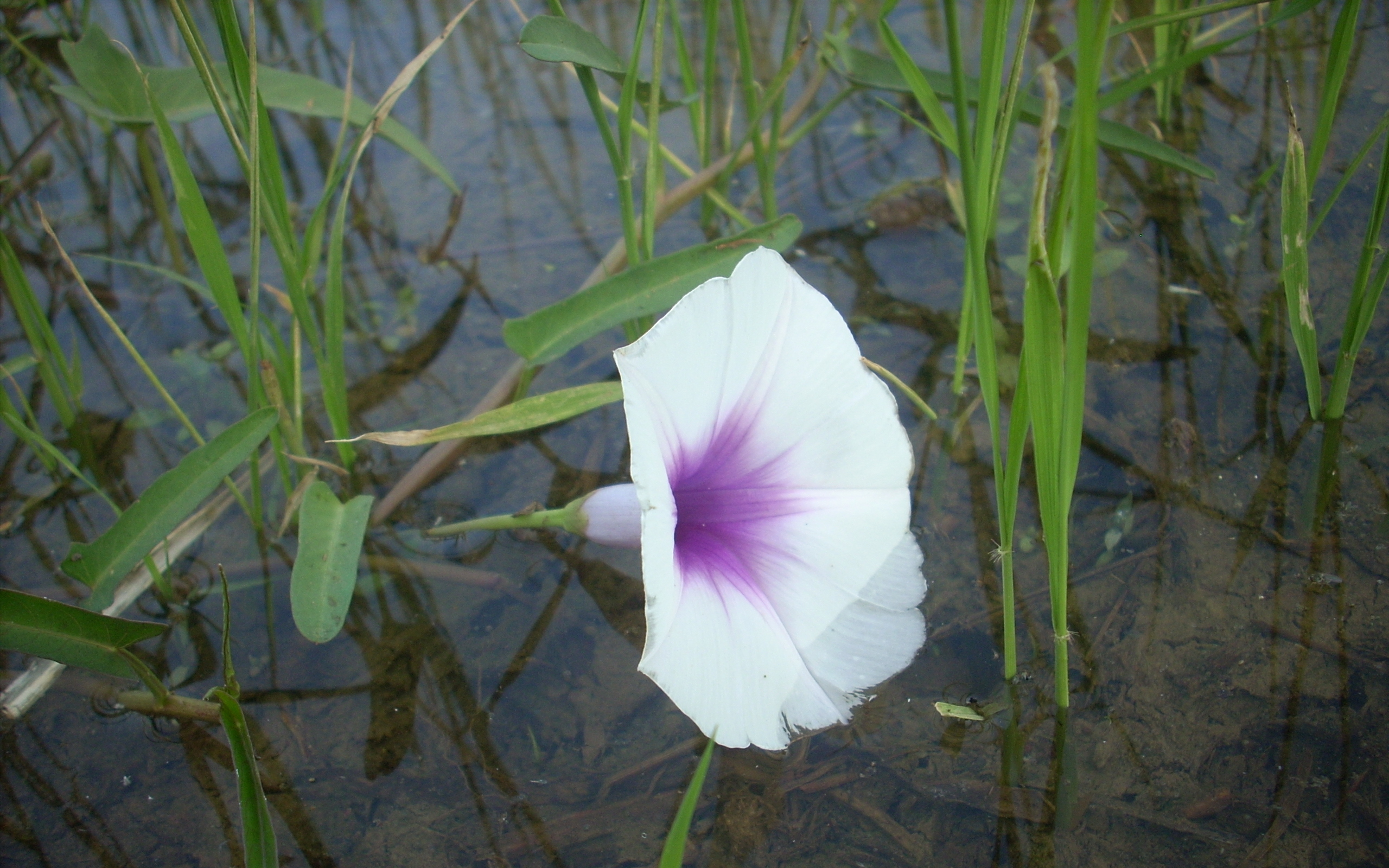
Ipomoea aquatica

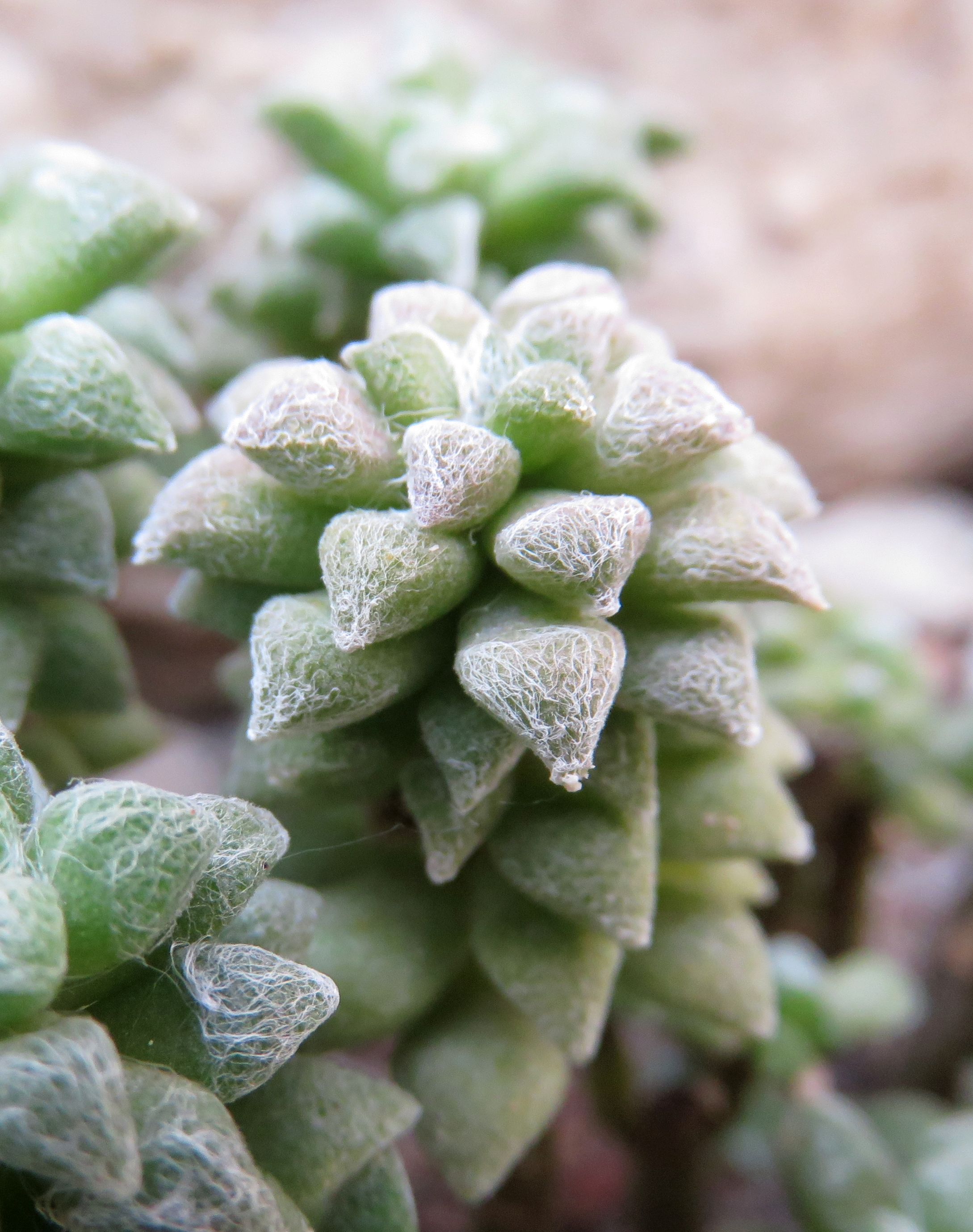
Anacampseros arachnoides

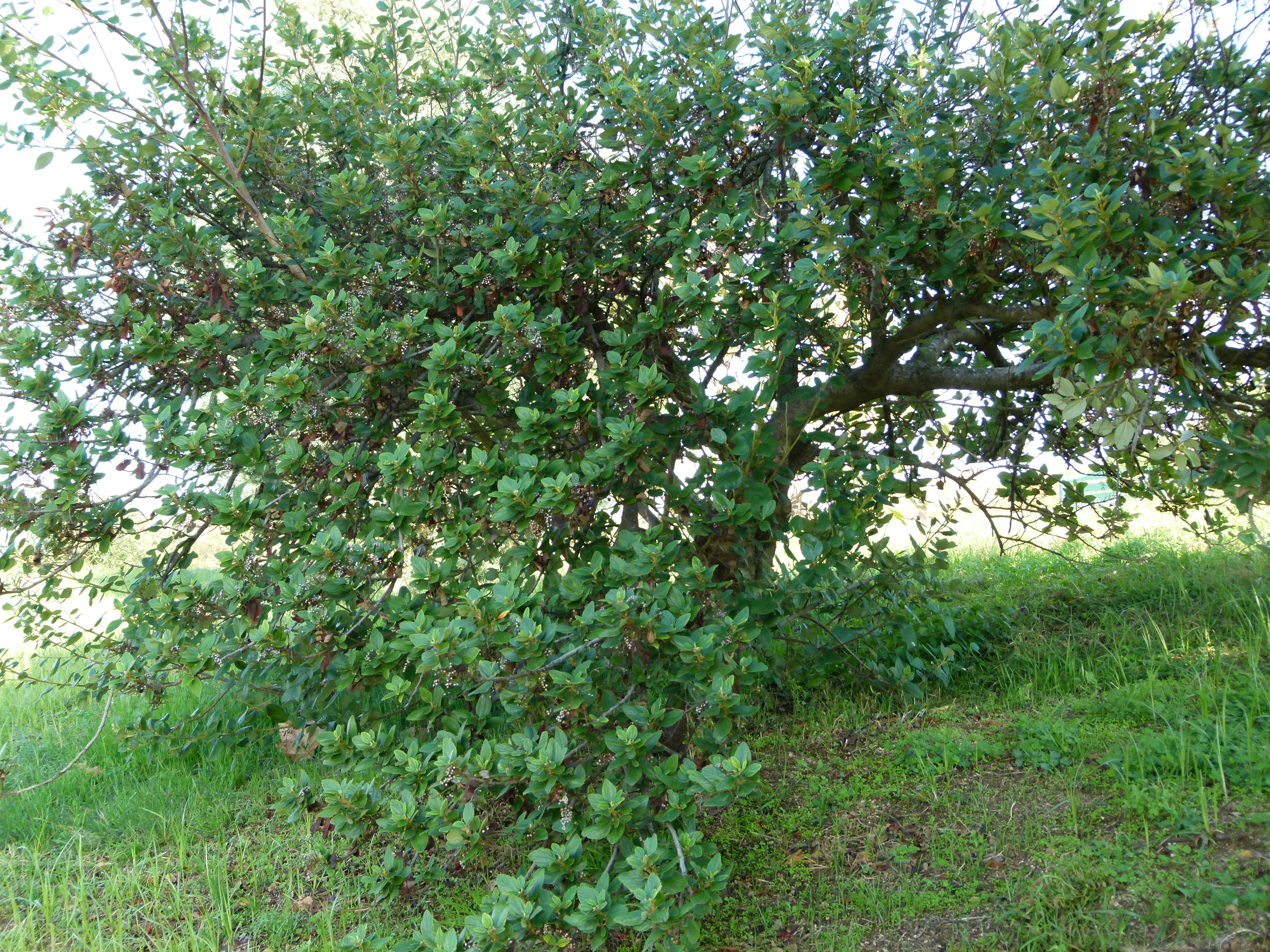
Ceanothus arboreus

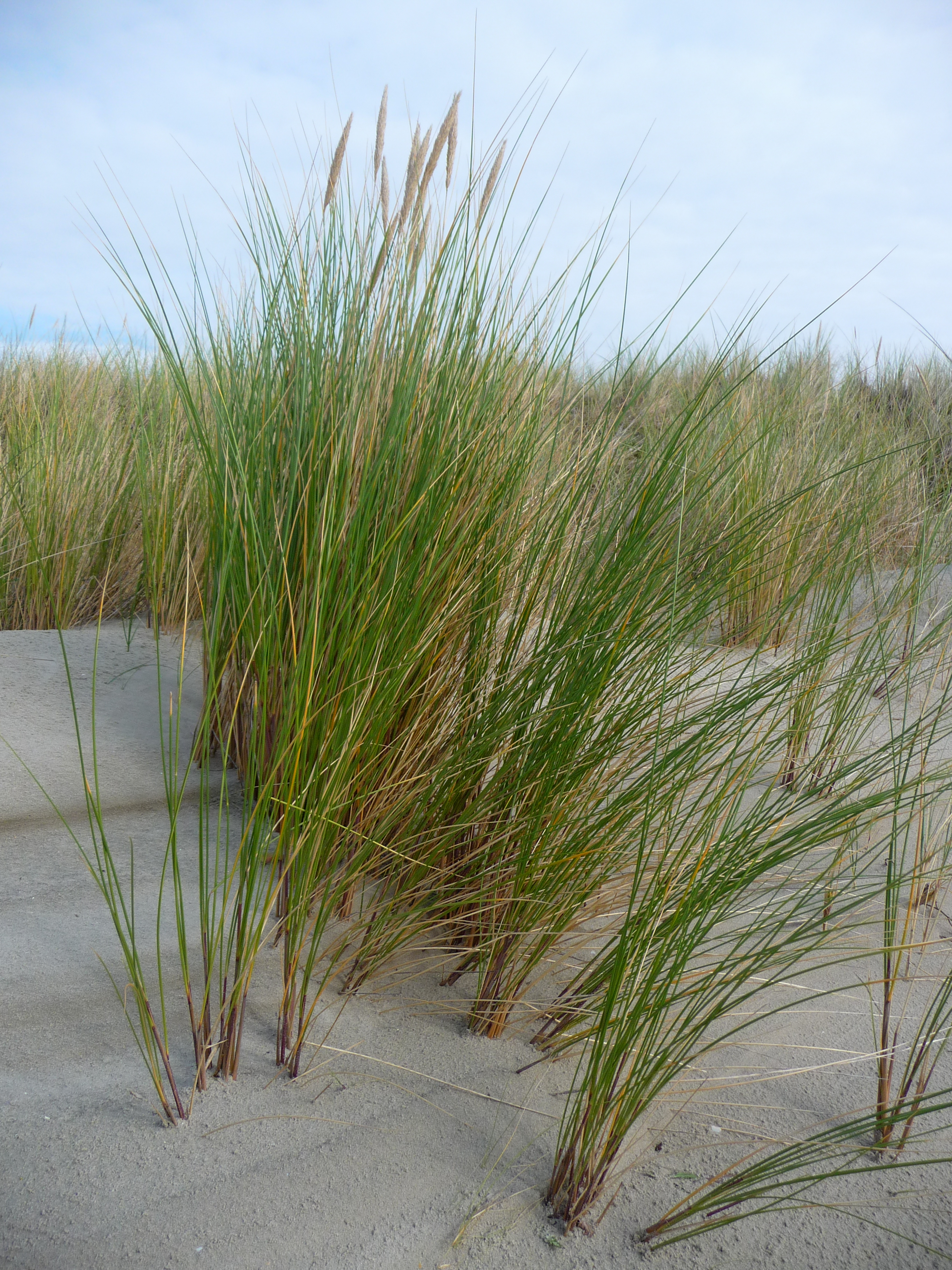
Ammophila arenaria

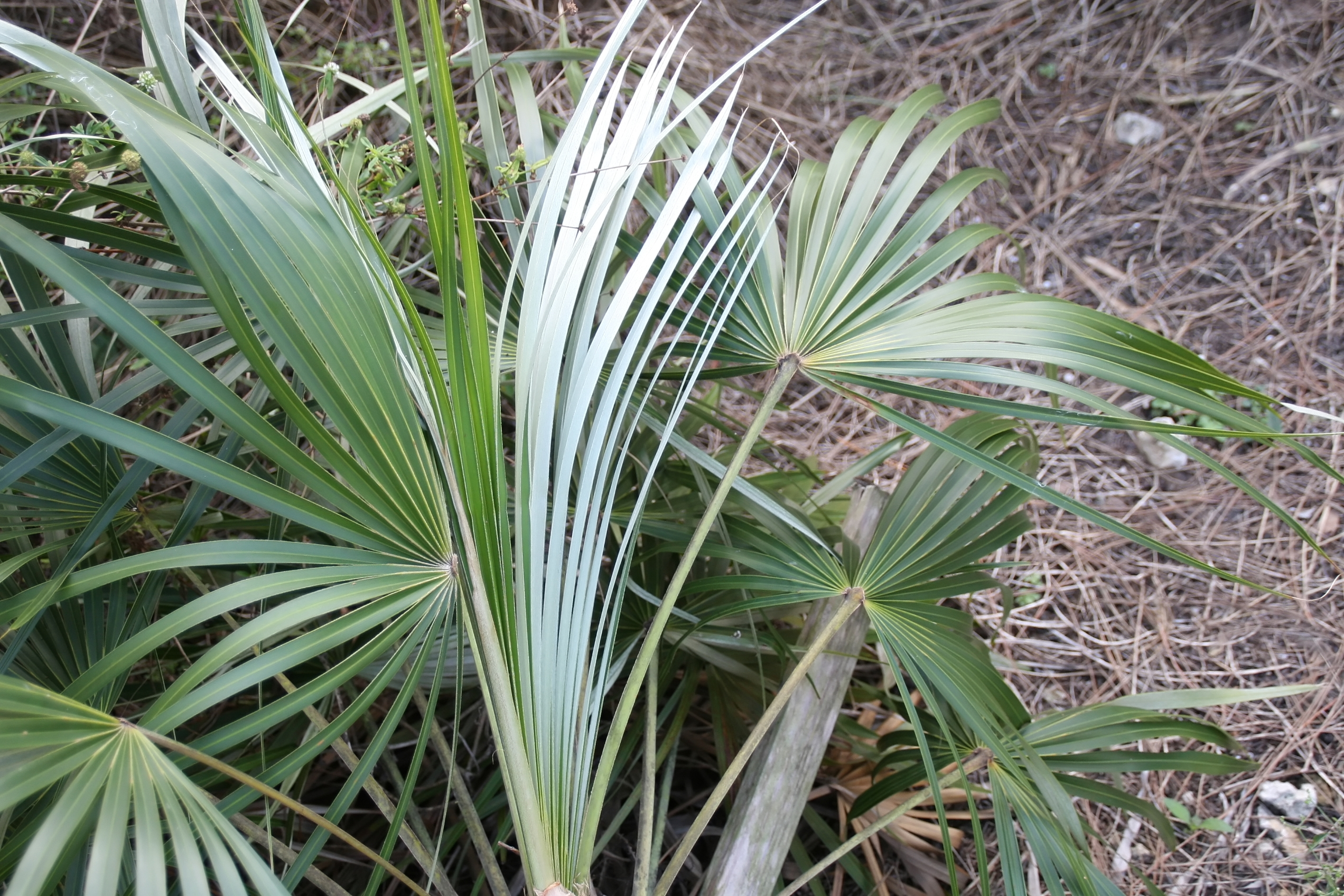
Coccothrinax argentata

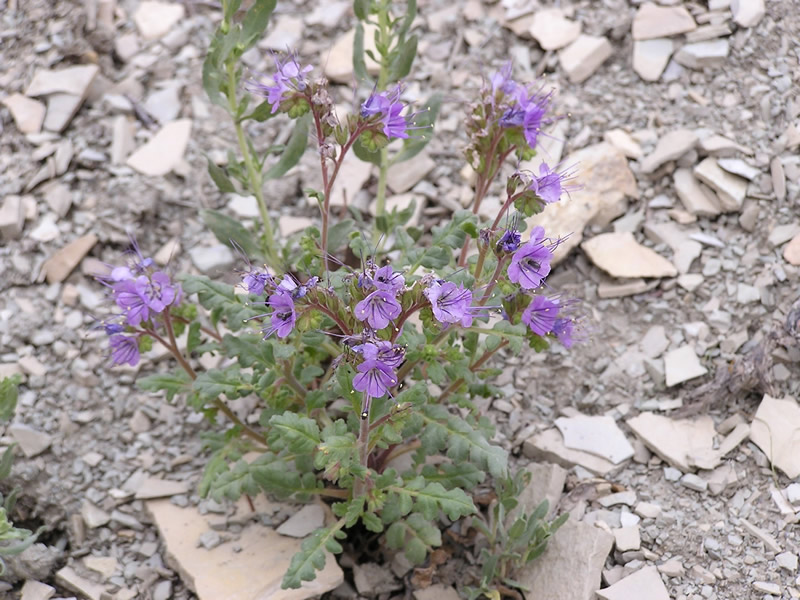
Phacelia argillacea

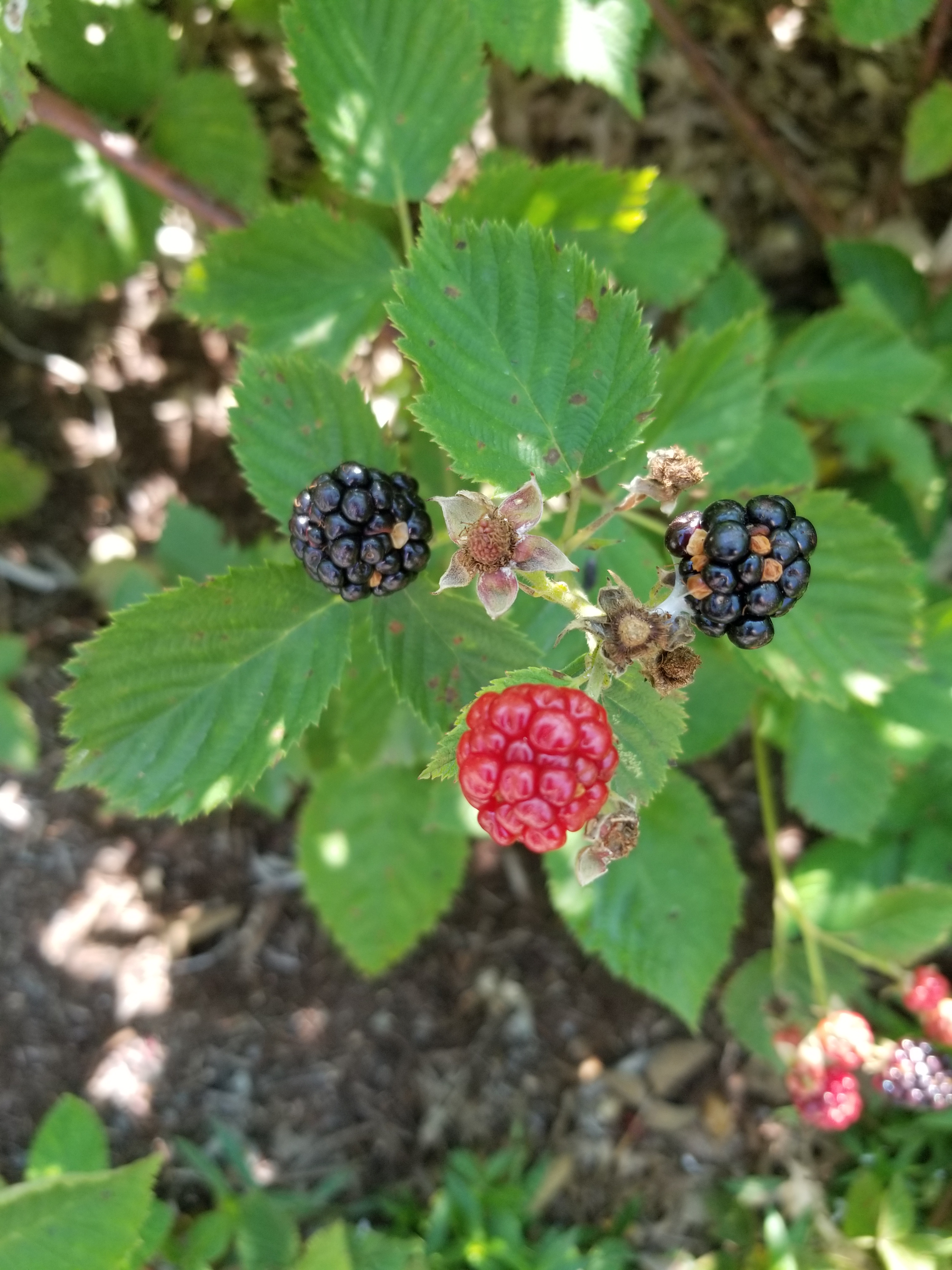
Rubus argutus

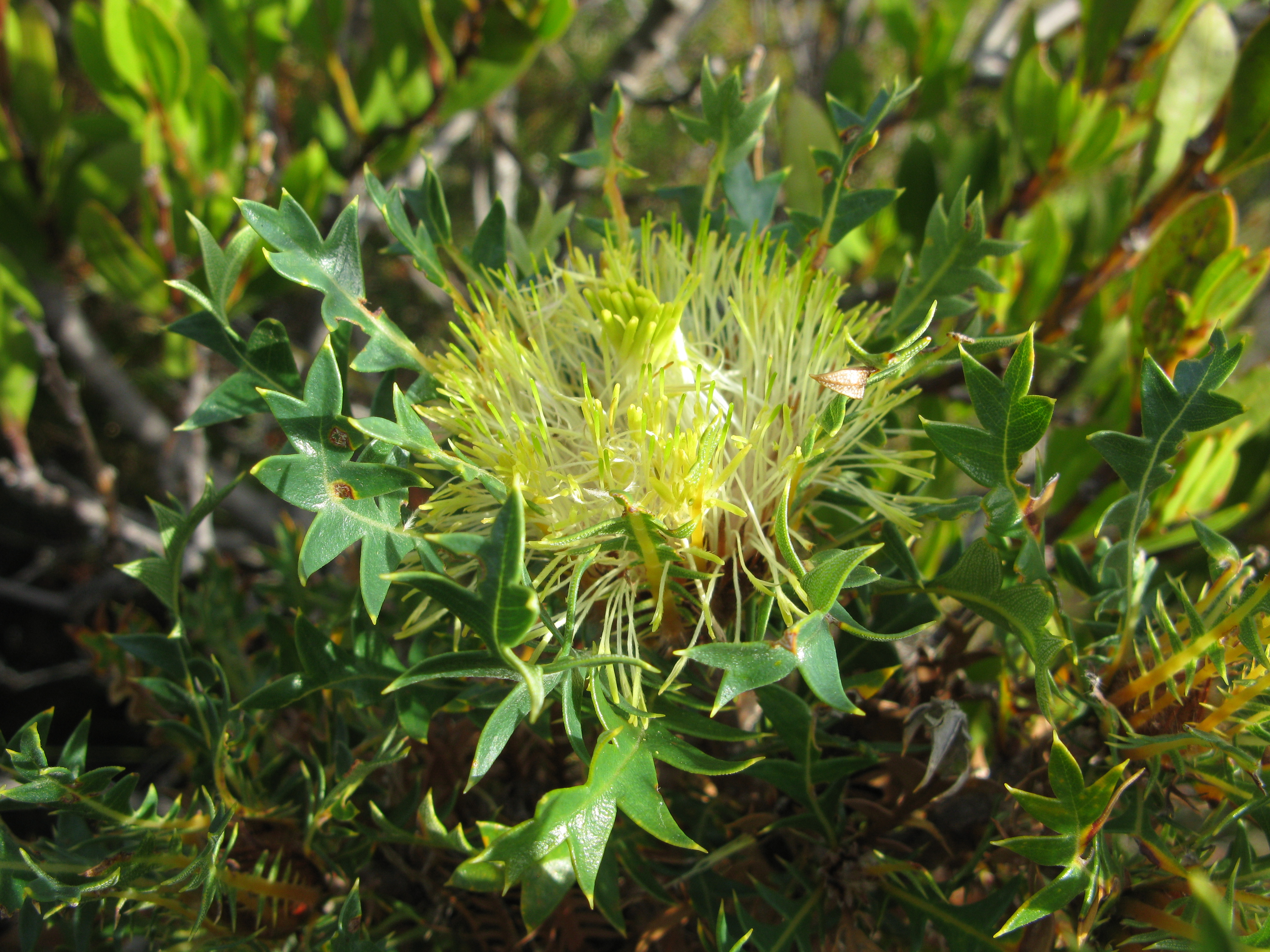
Banksia armata

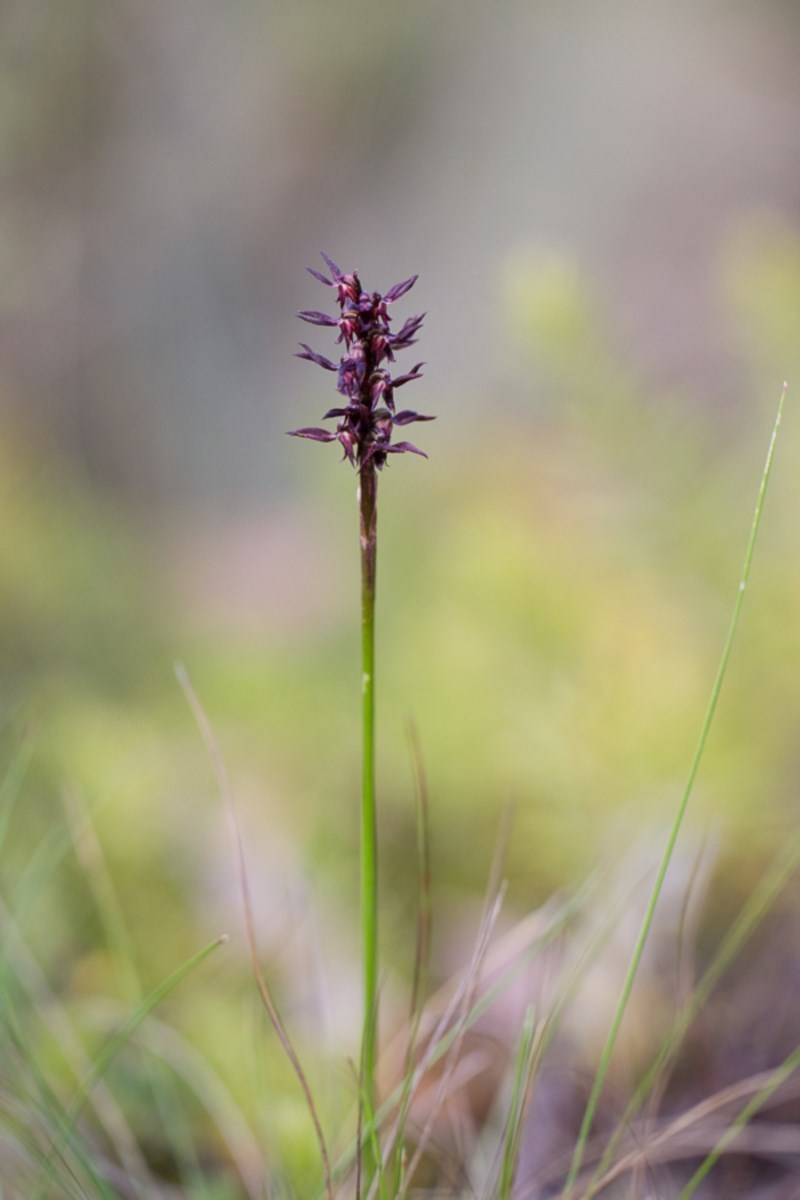
Genoplesium arrectum

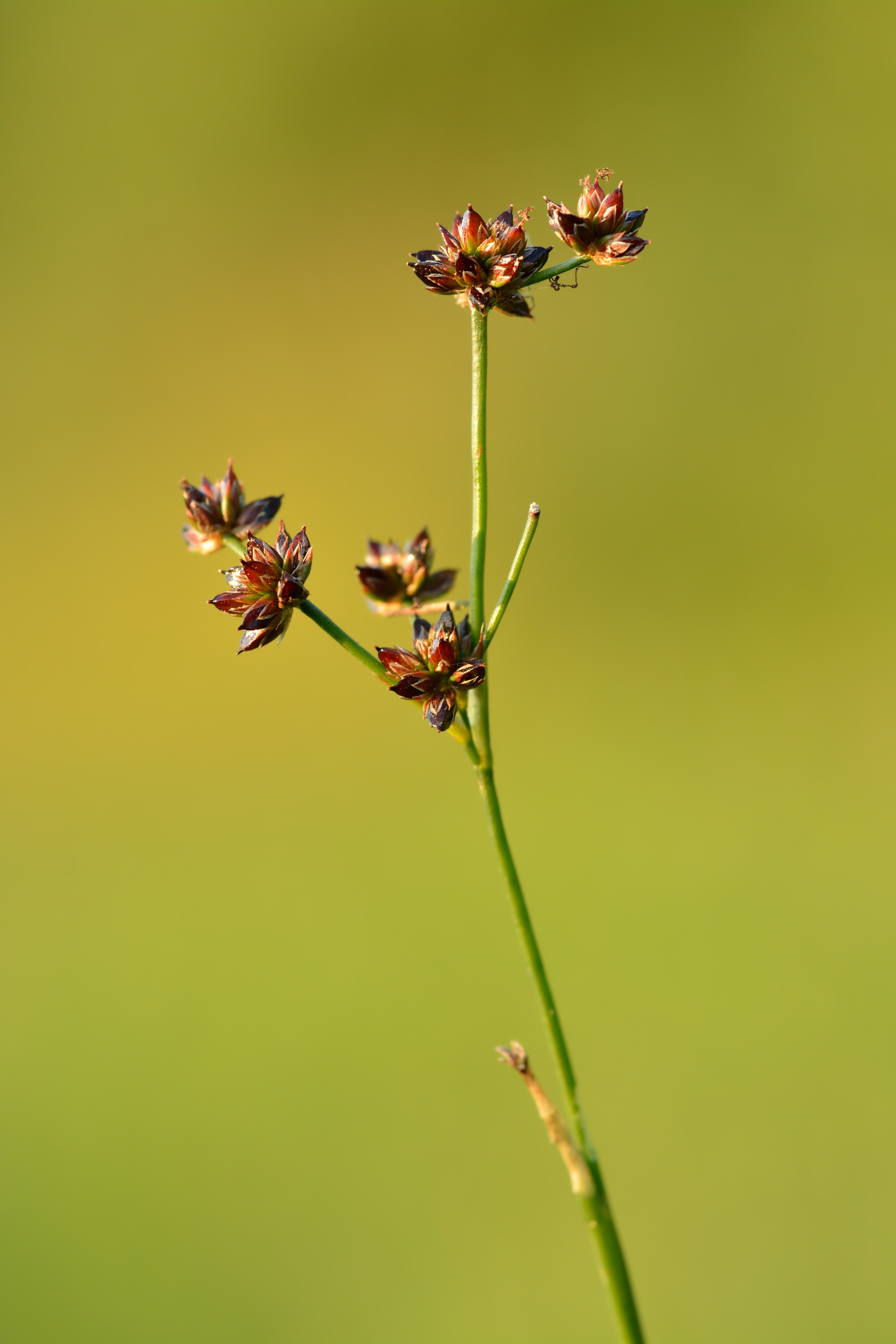
Juncus articulatus

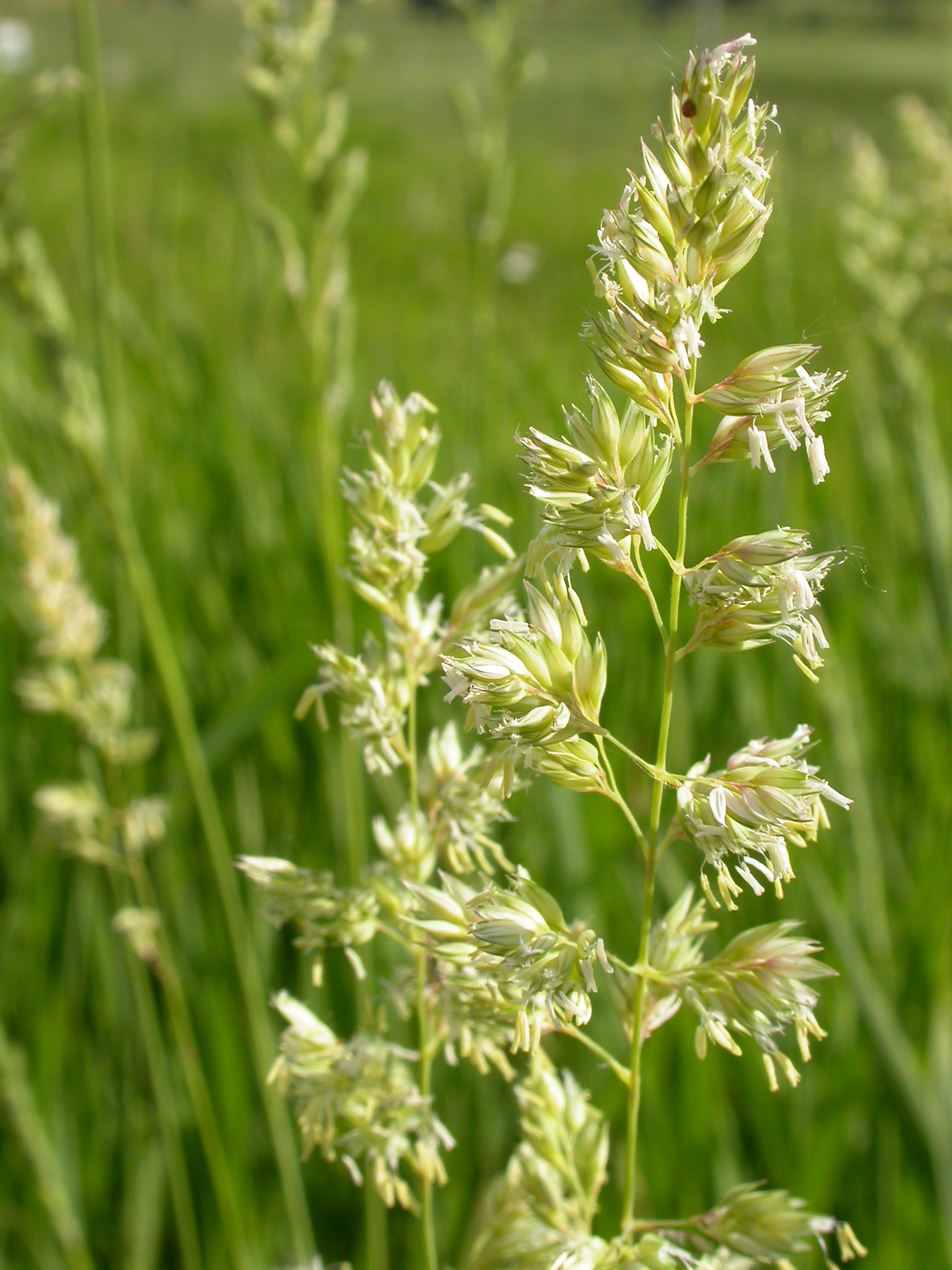
Phalaris arundinacea

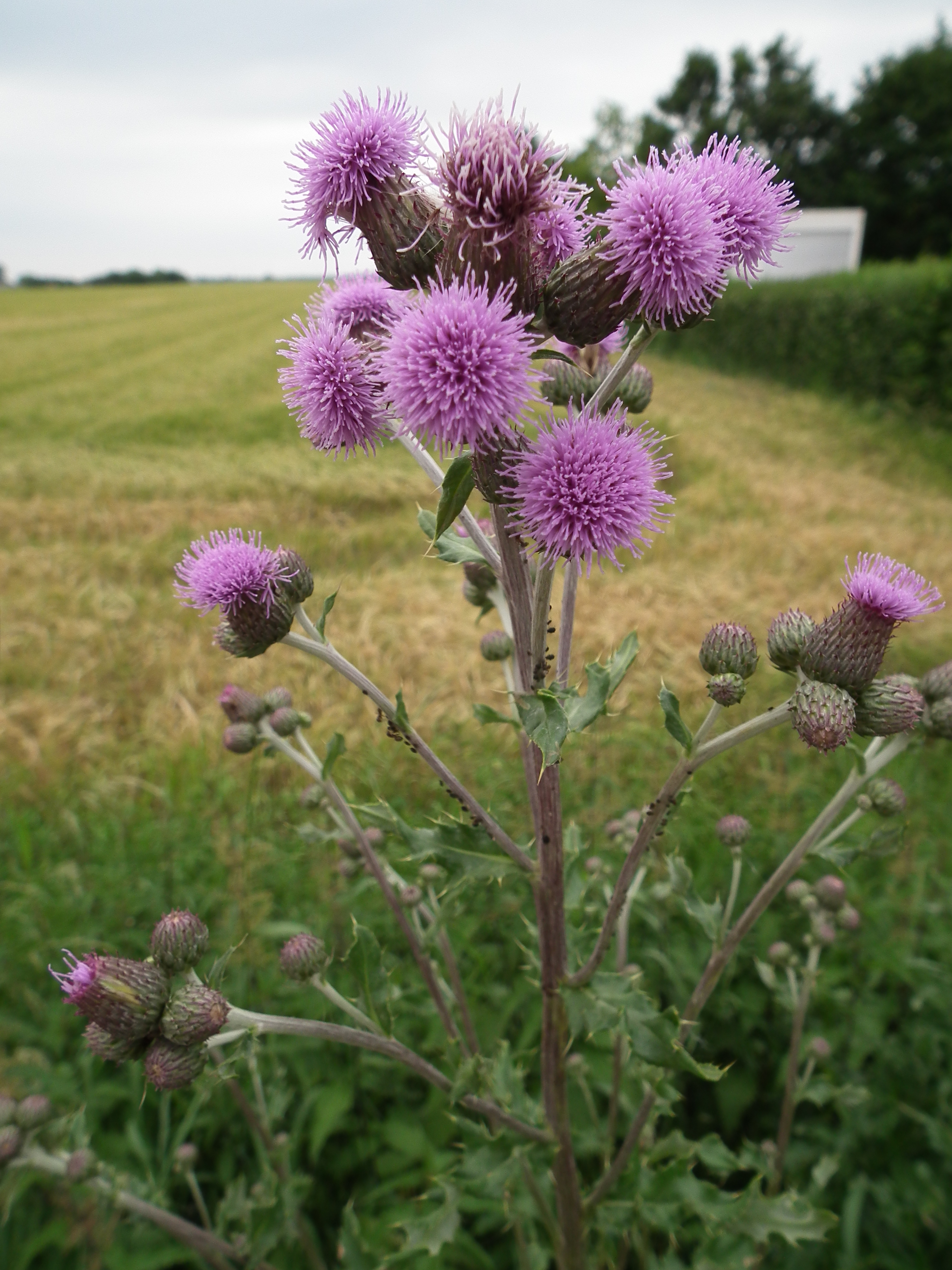
Cirsium arvense

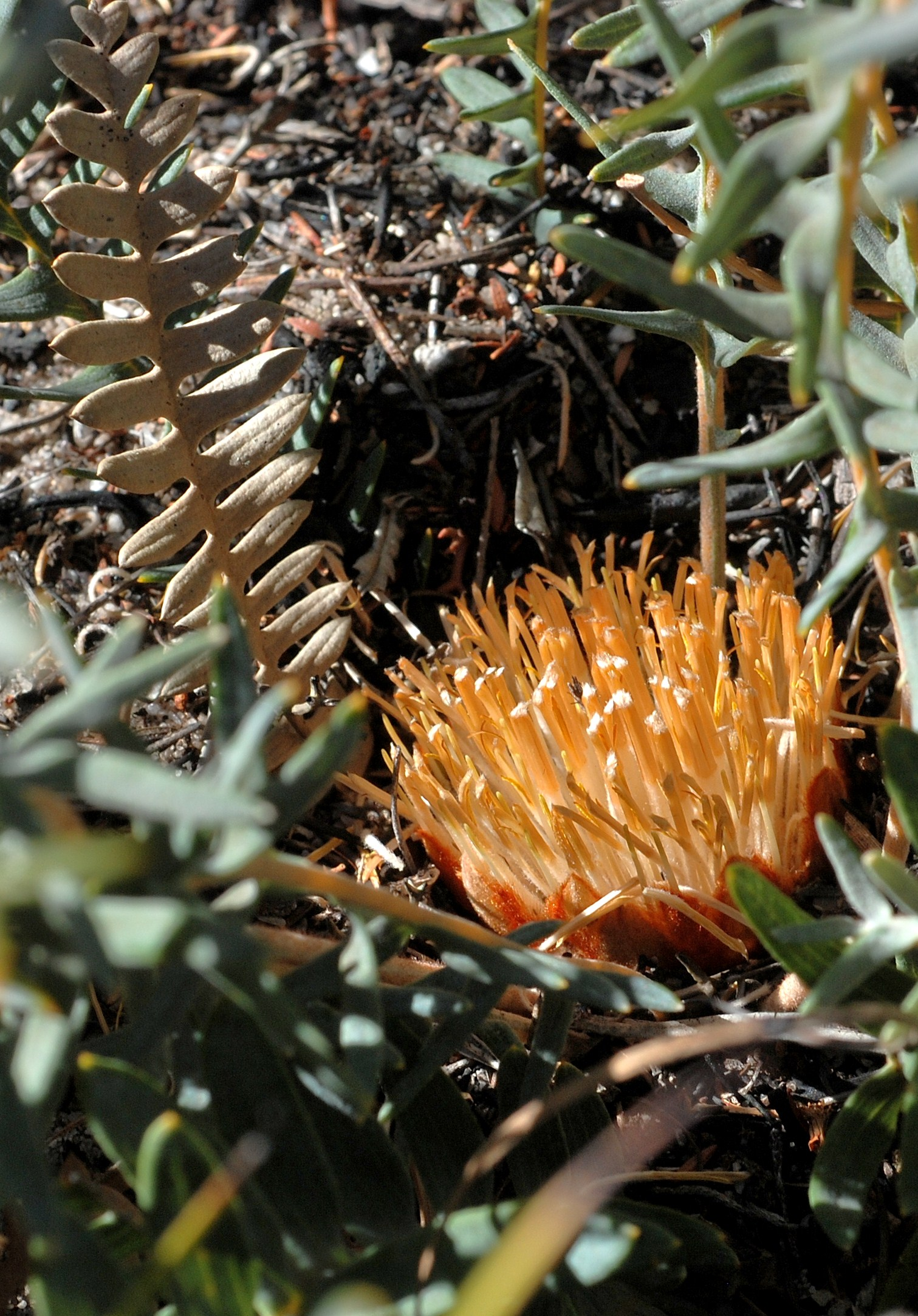
Banksia aurantia

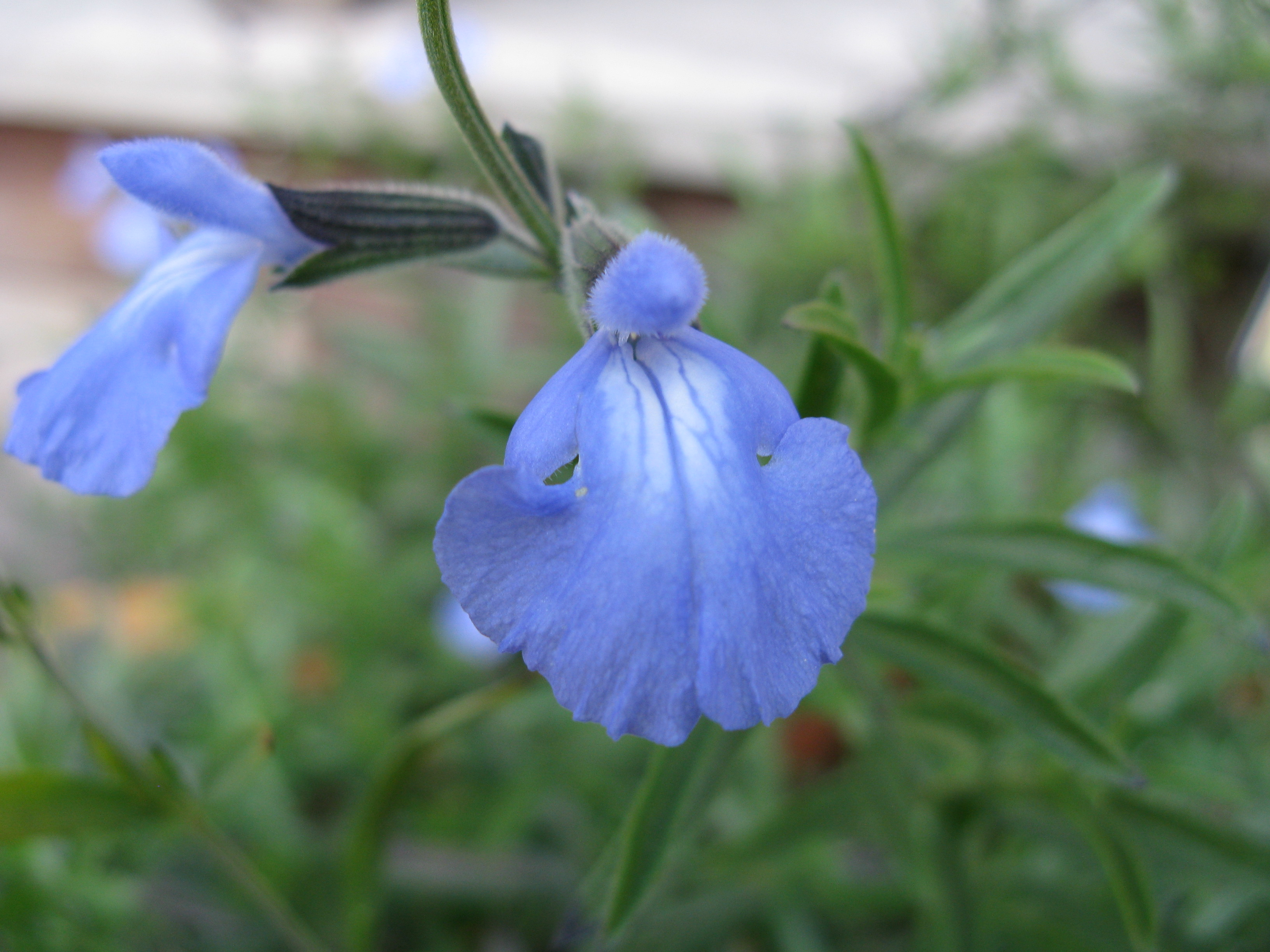
Salvia azurea

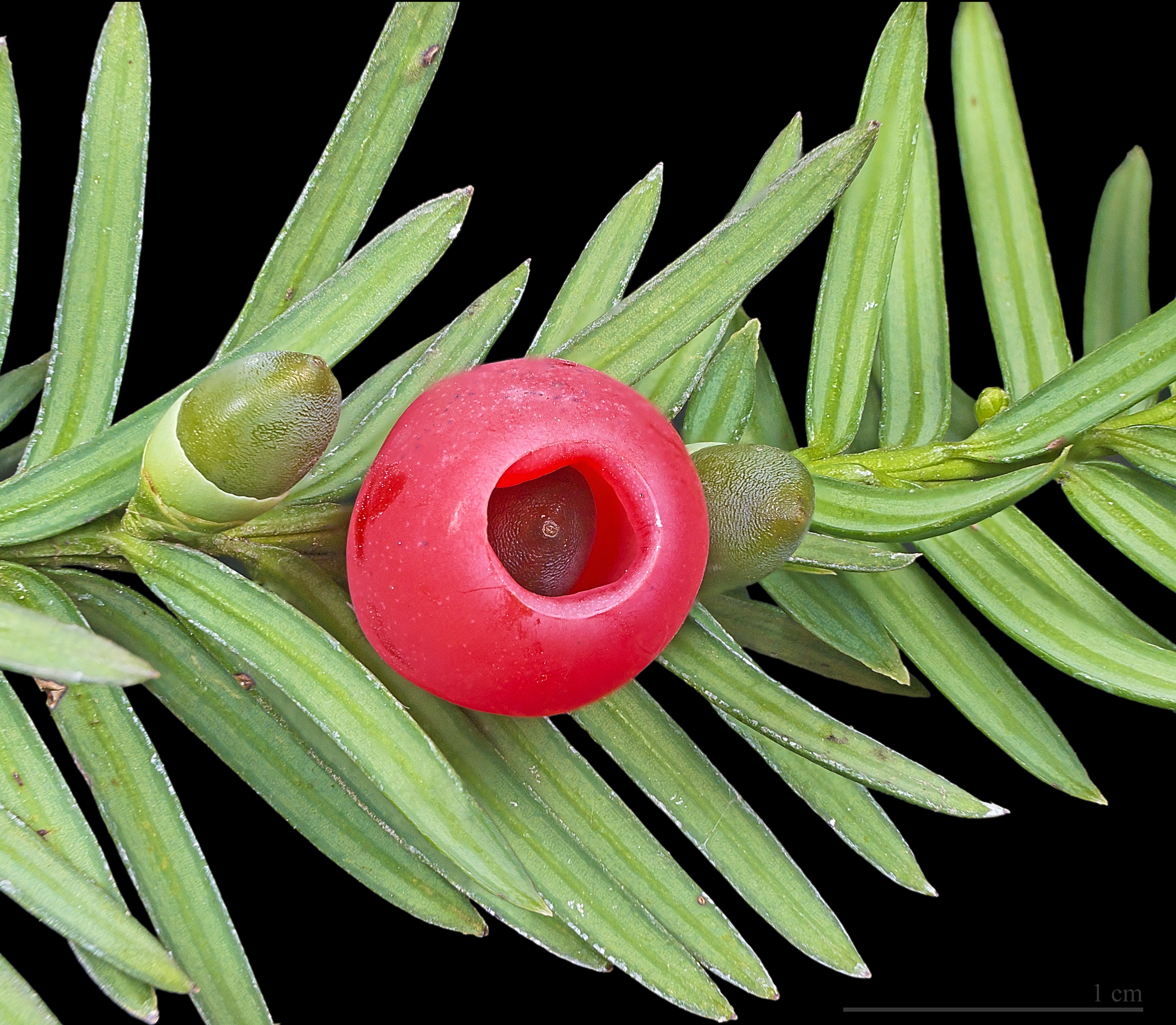
Taxus baccata

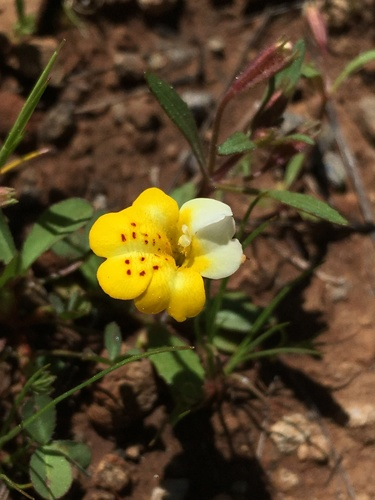
Erythranthe bicolor

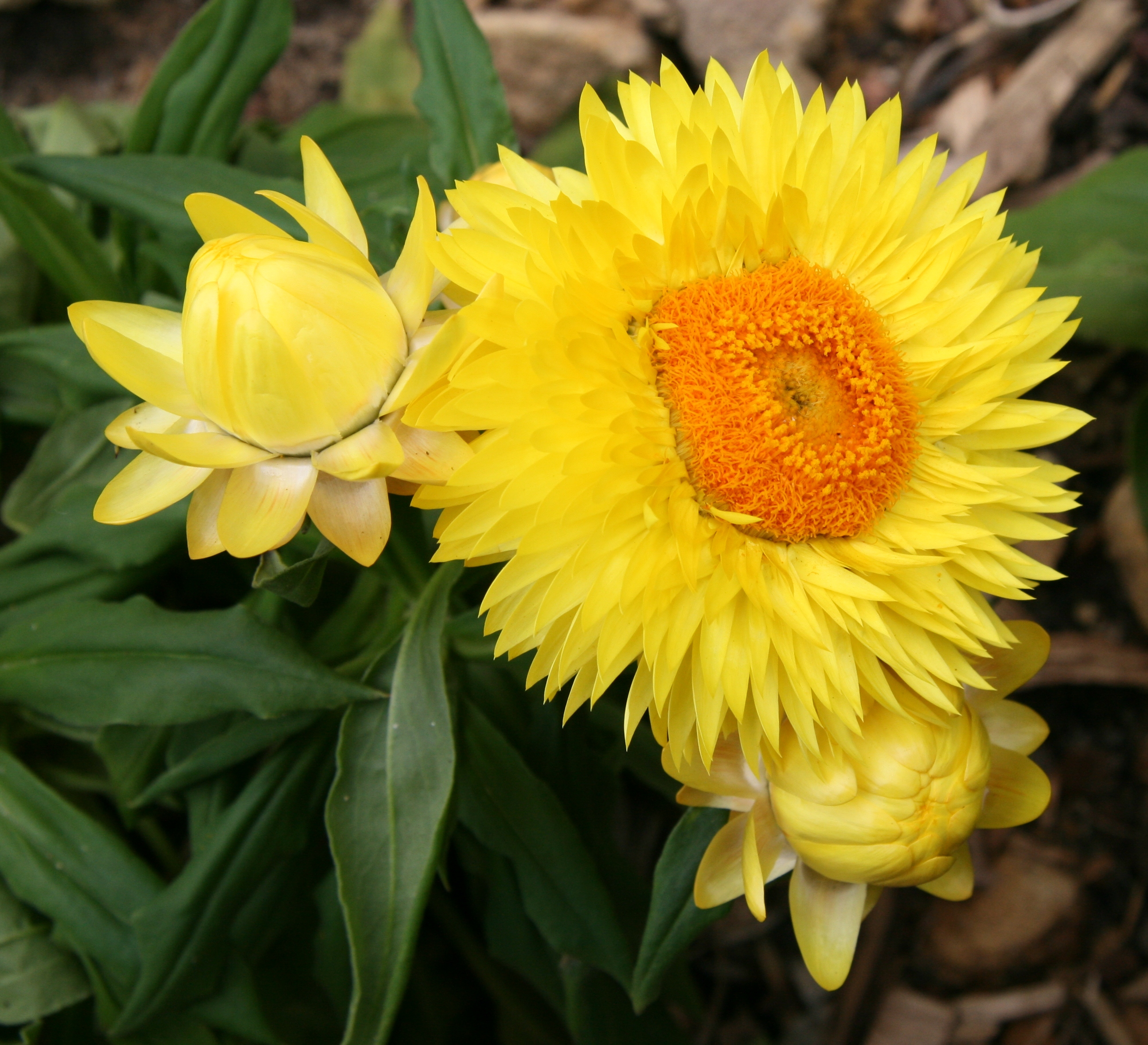
Yellow bracts on Xerochrysum bracteatum

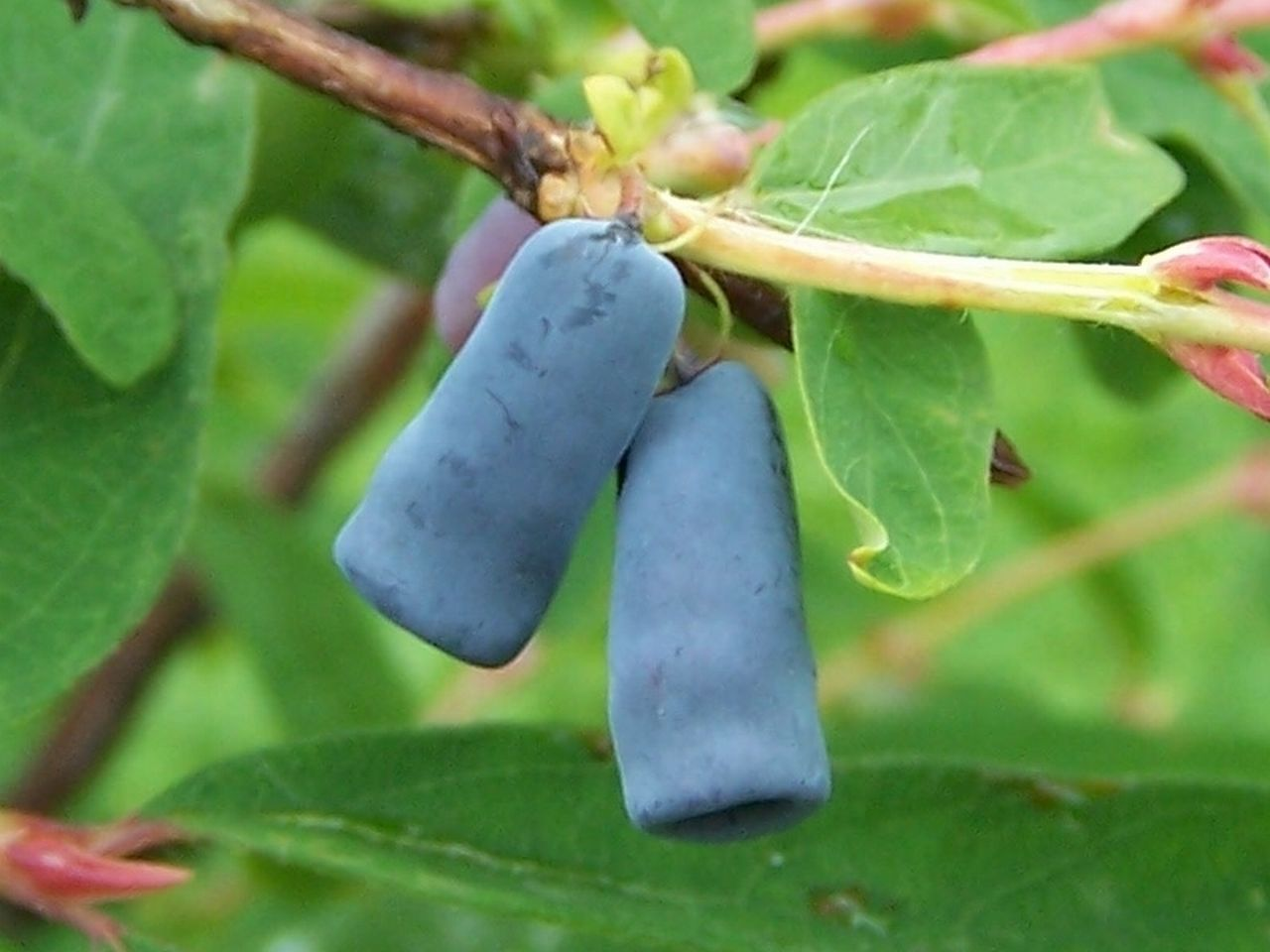
Lonicera caerulea

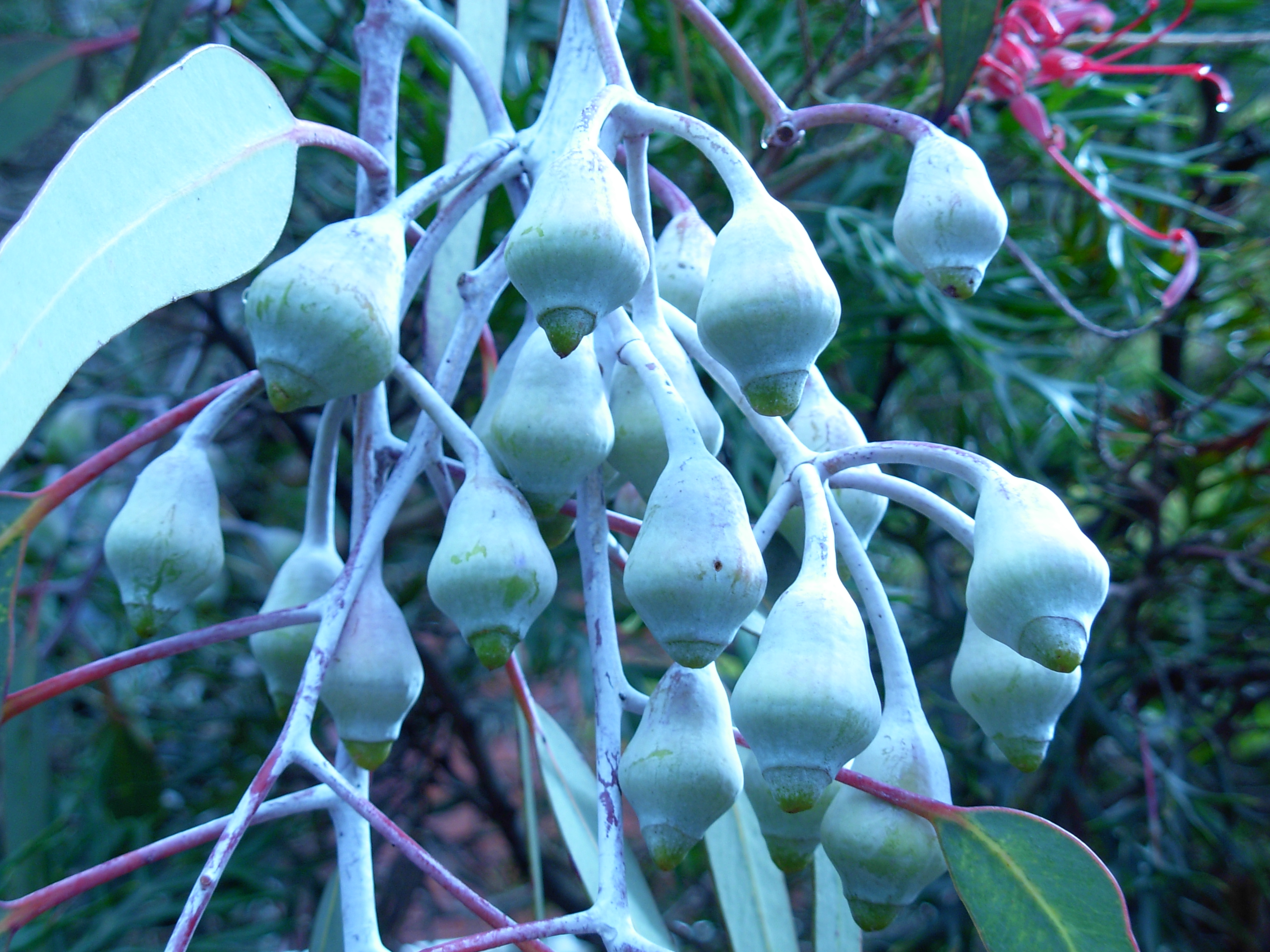
Eucalyptus caesia

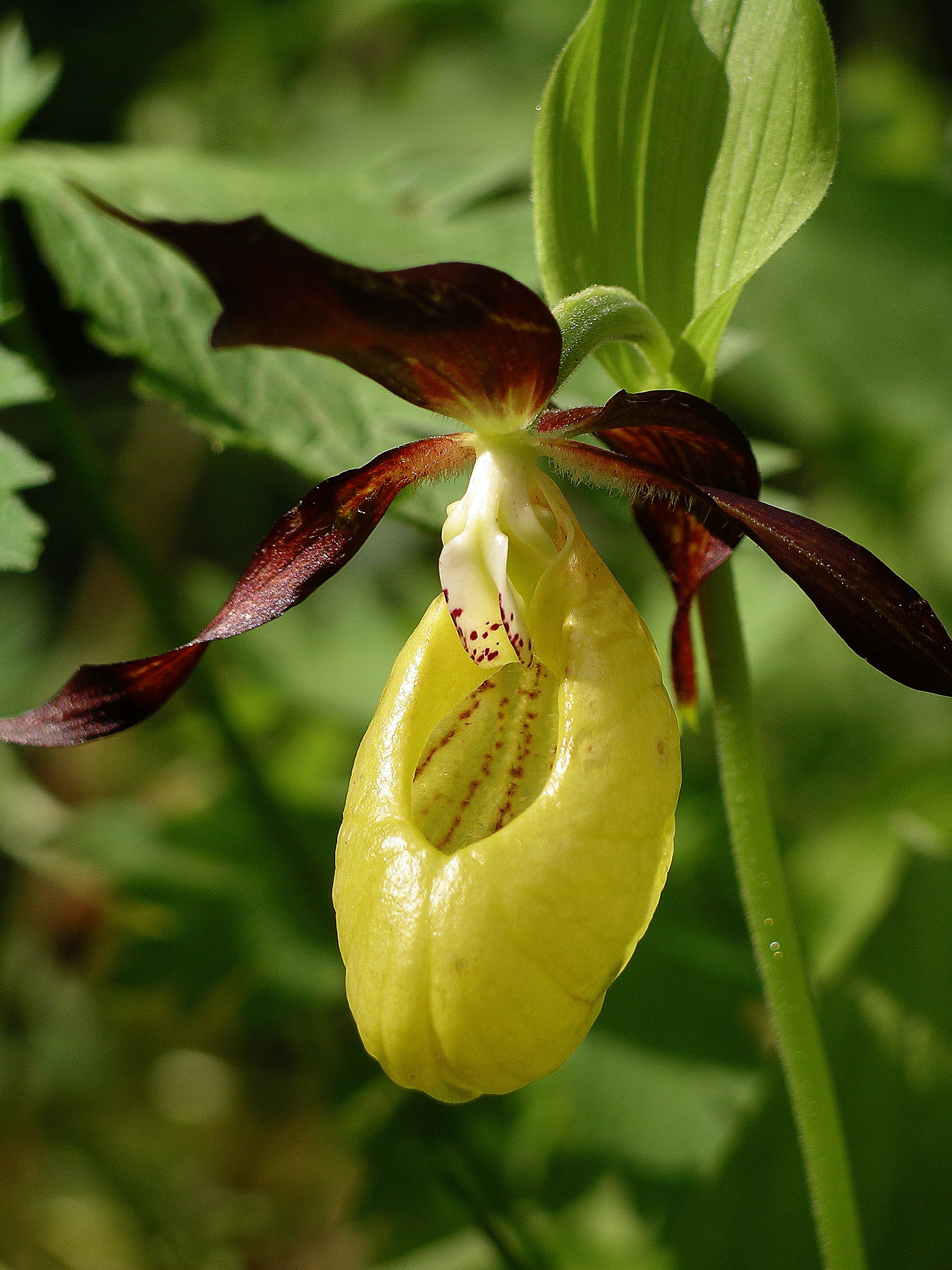
Cypripedium calceolus

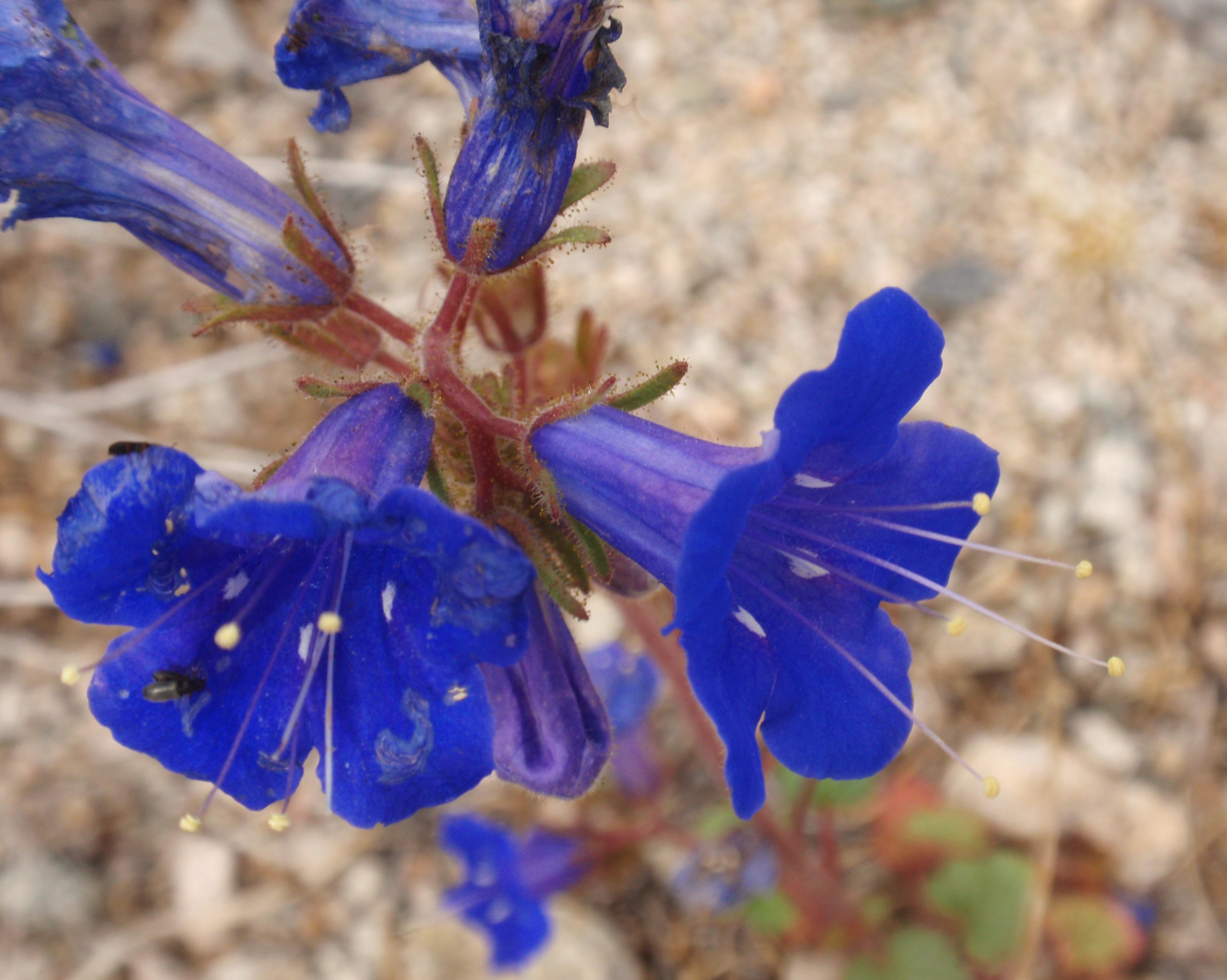
Phacelia campanularia

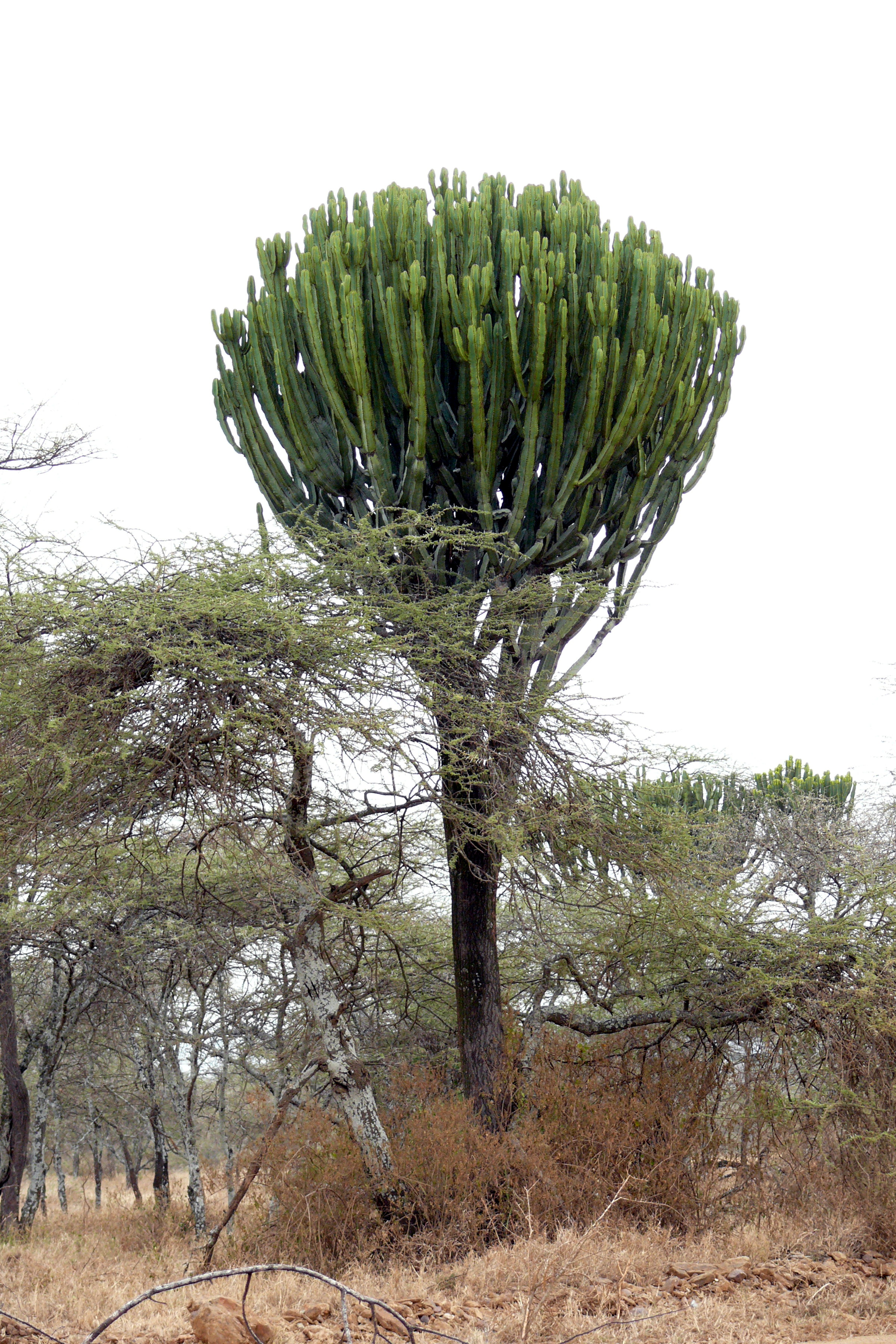
Euphorbia candelabrum

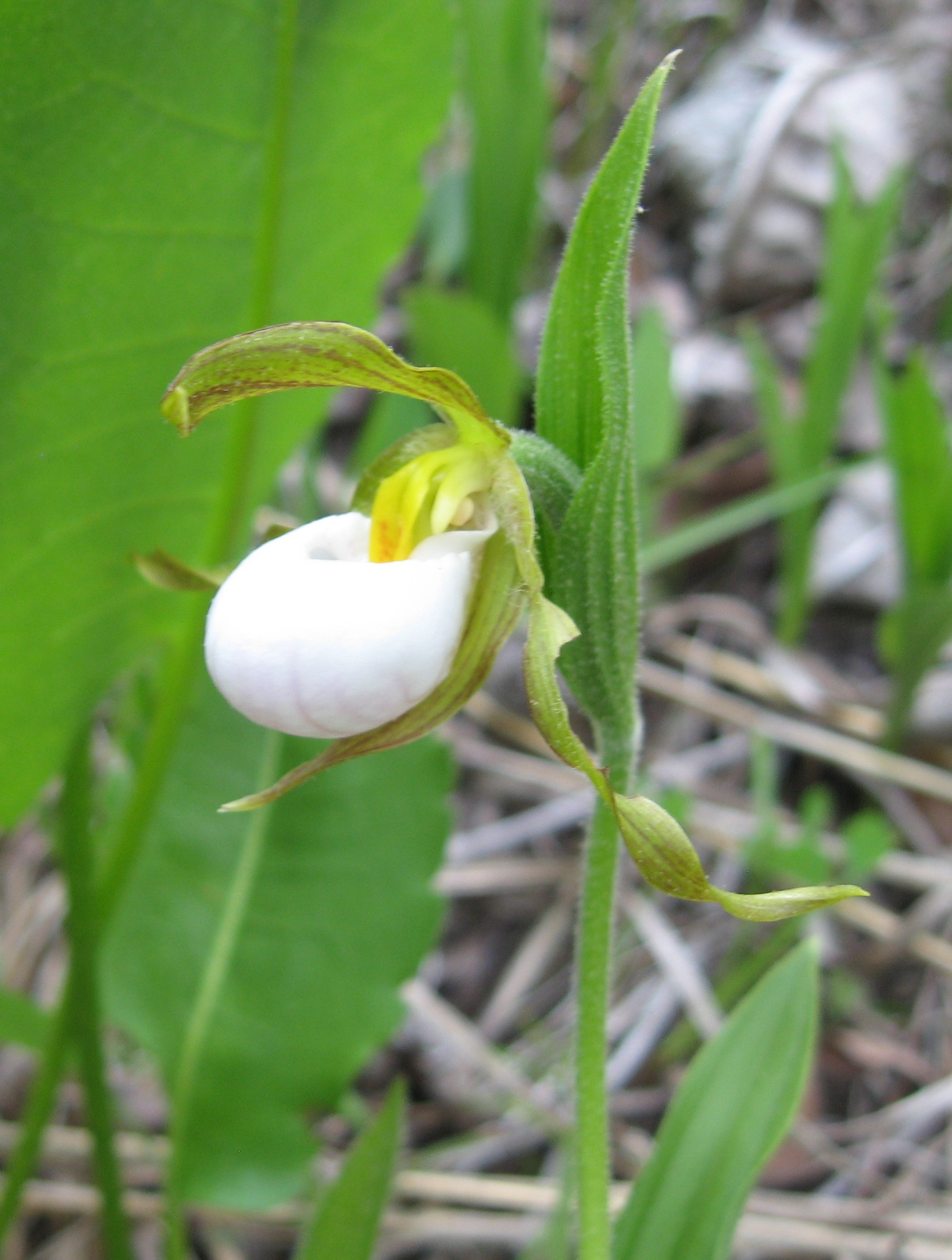
Cypripedium candidum

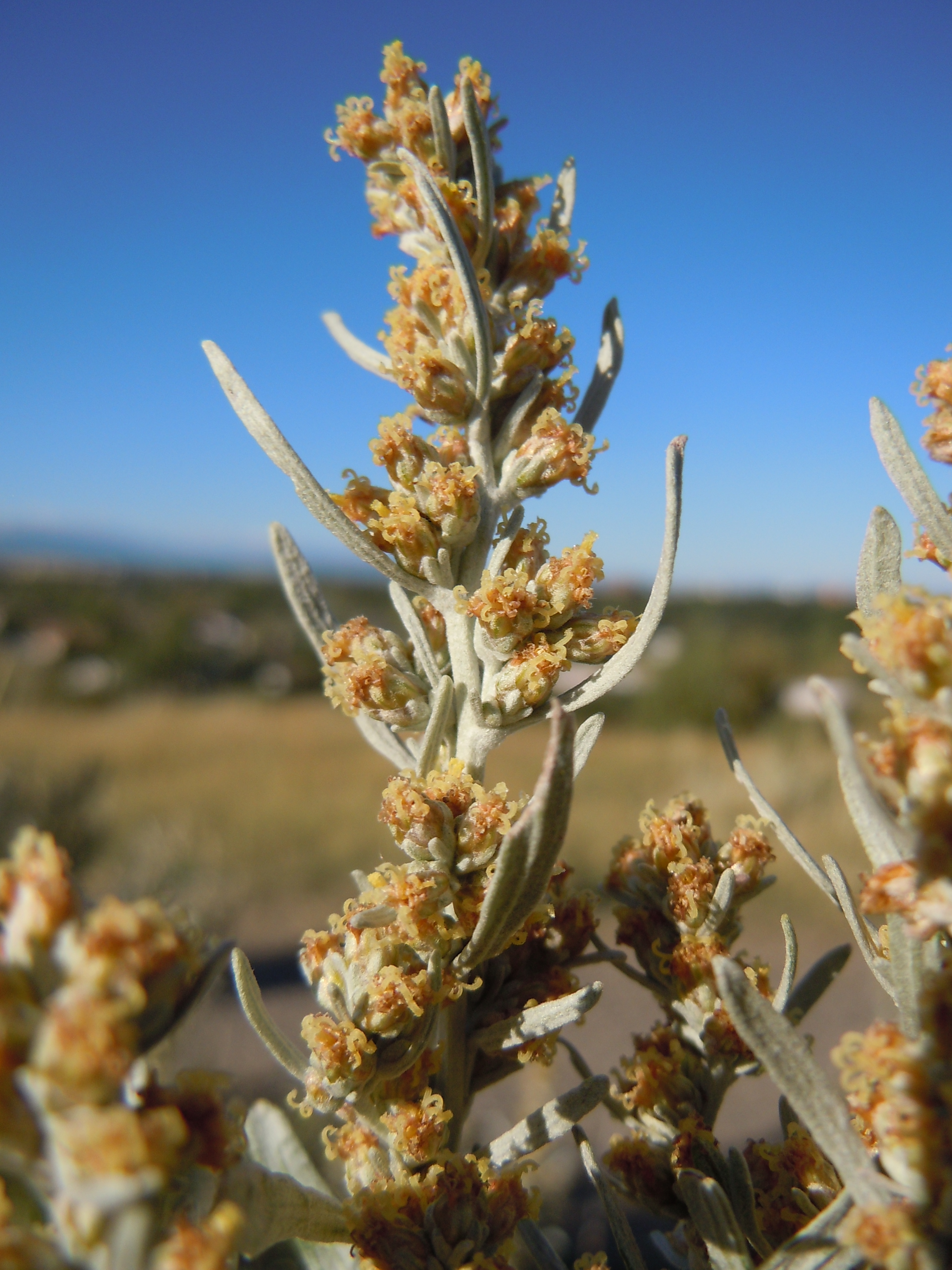
Artemisia cana

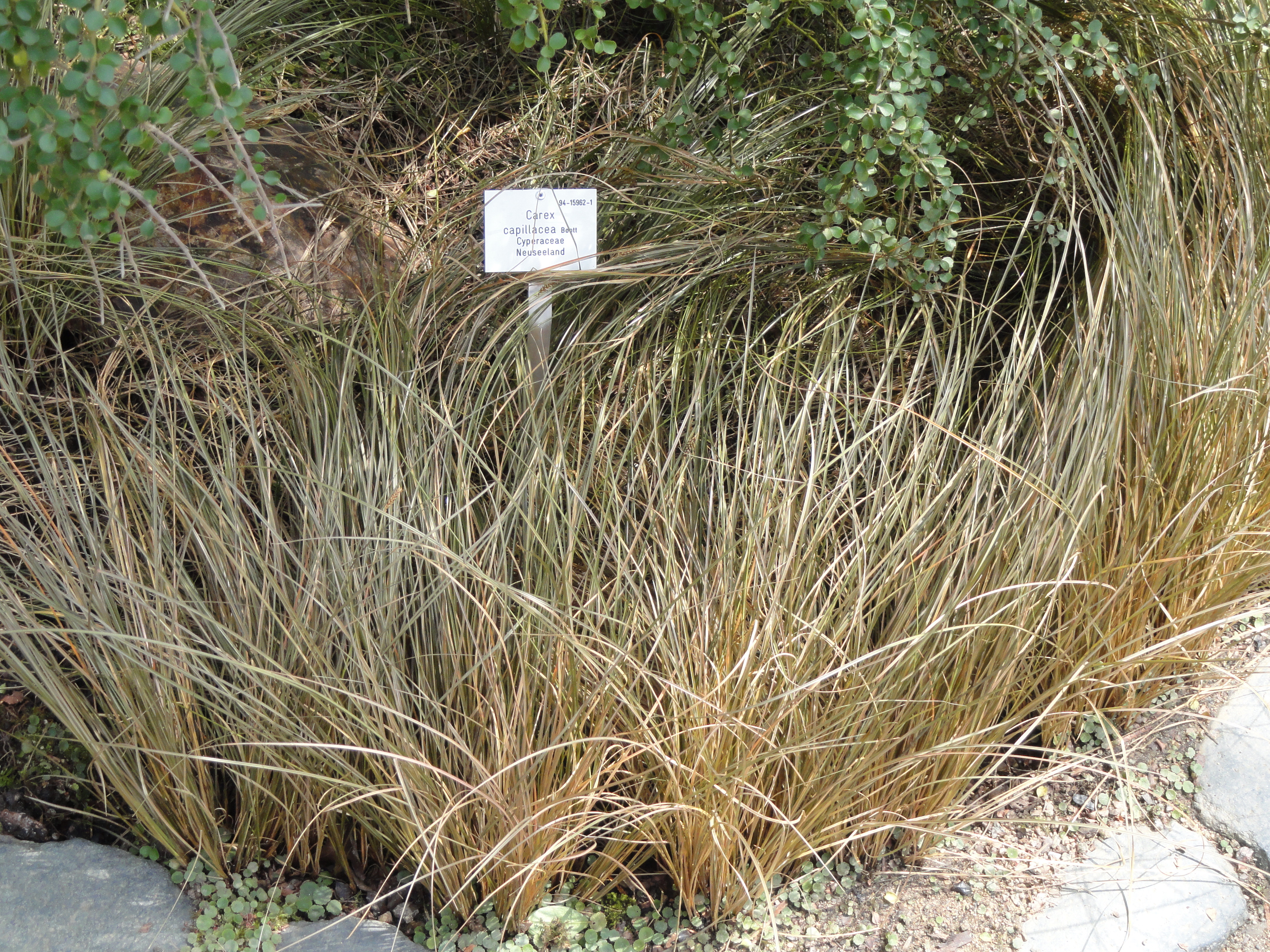
Carex capillacea

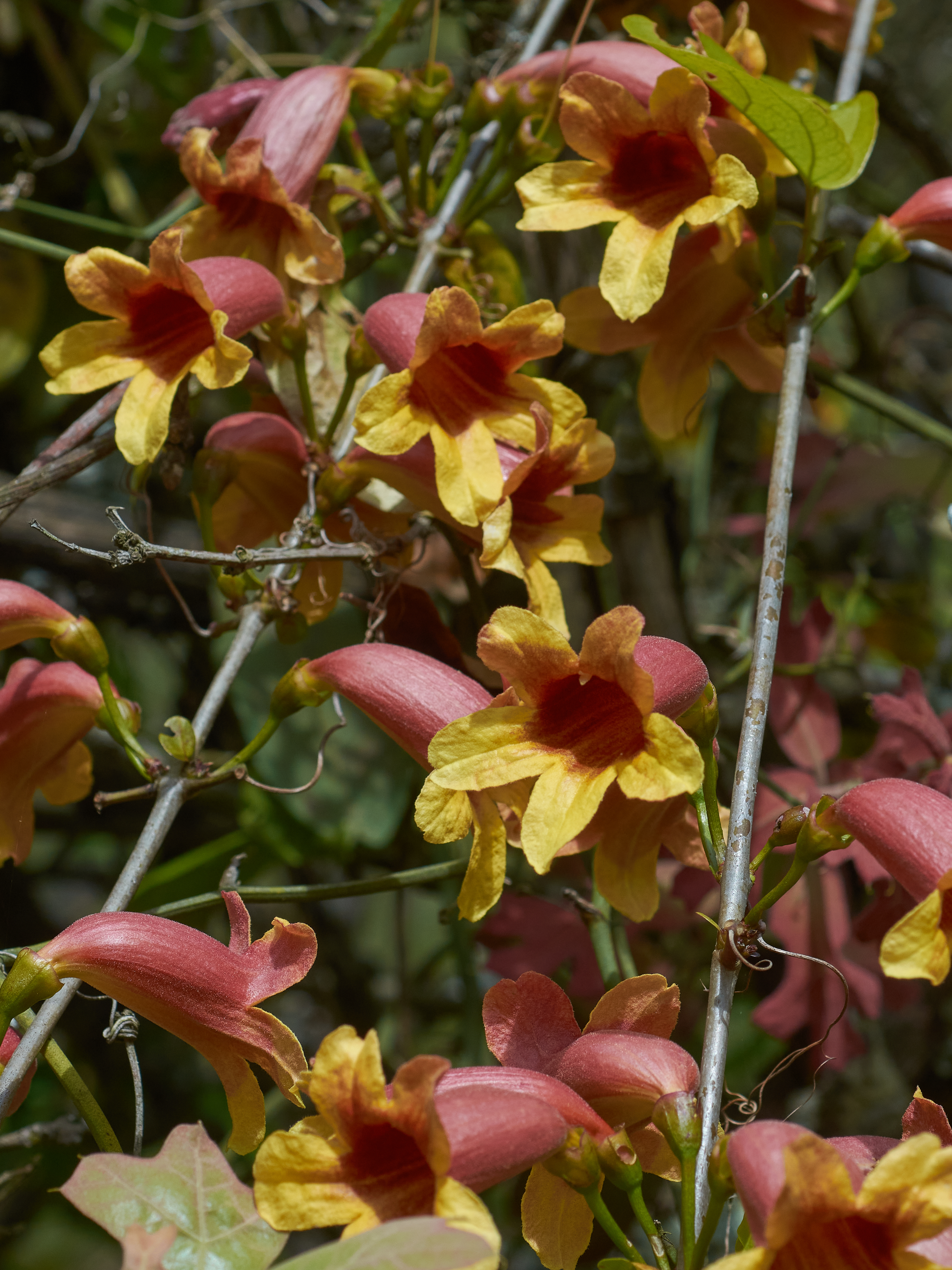
Bignonia capreolata

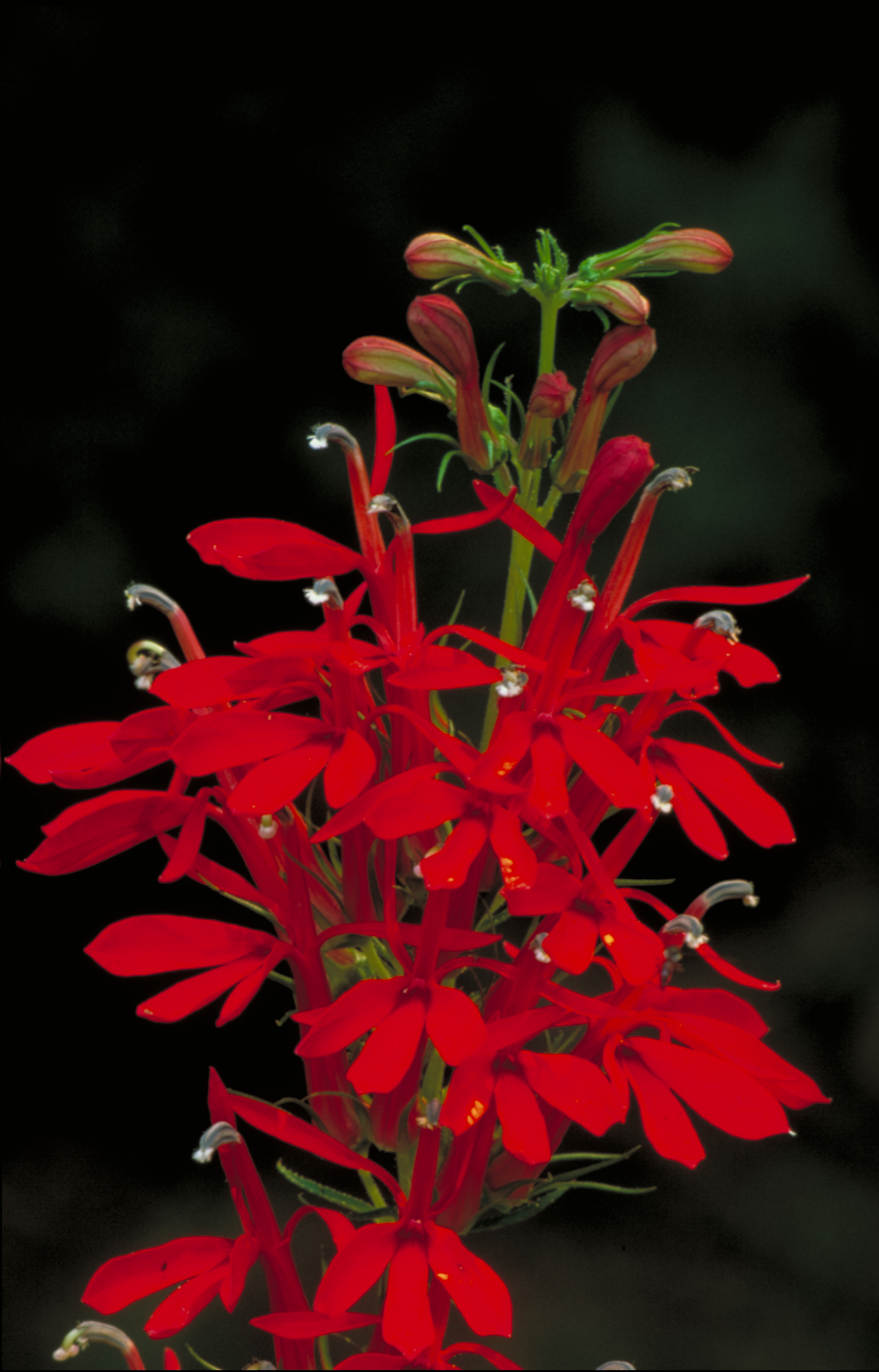
Lobelia cardinalis

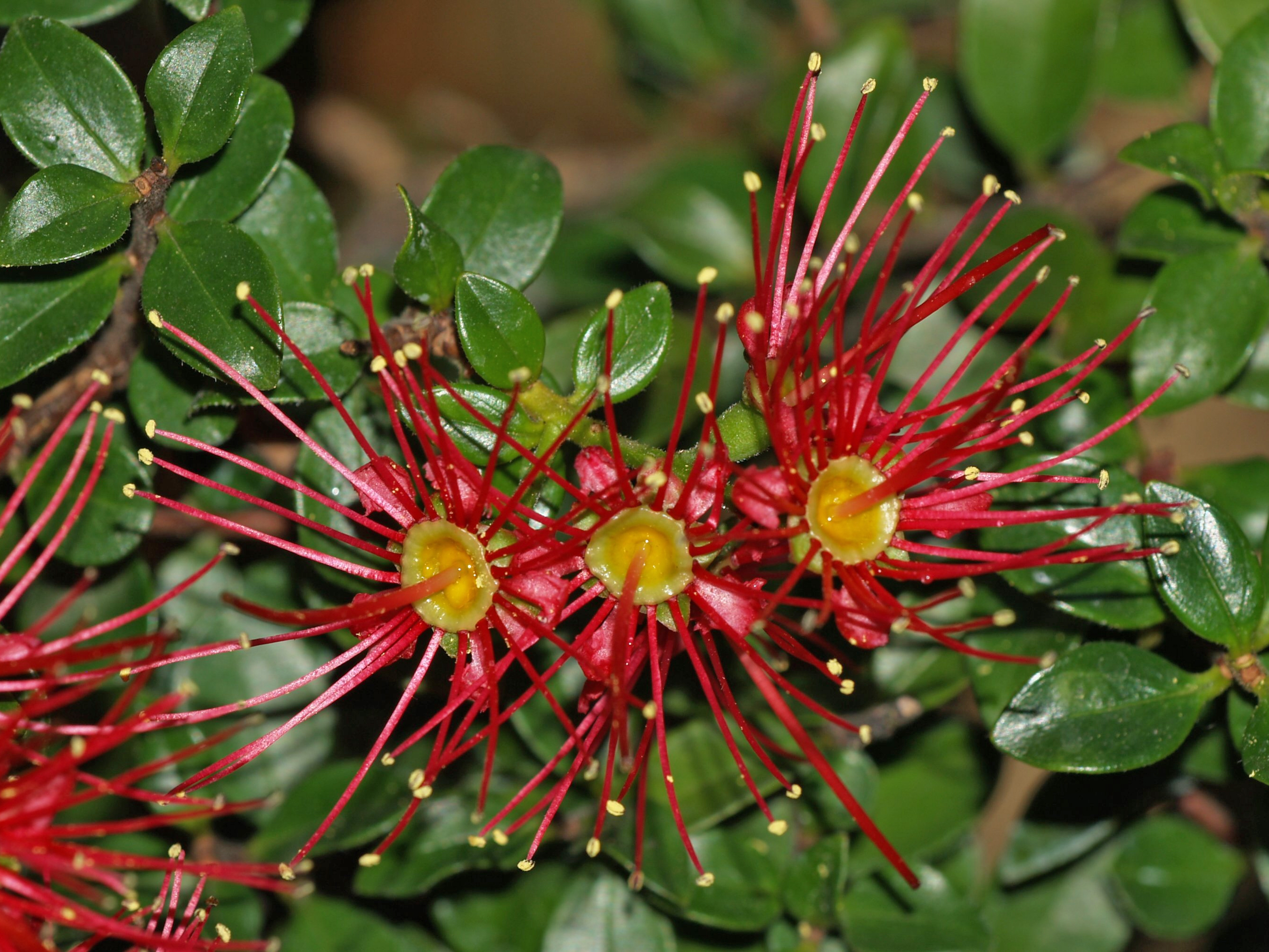
Metrosideros carminea

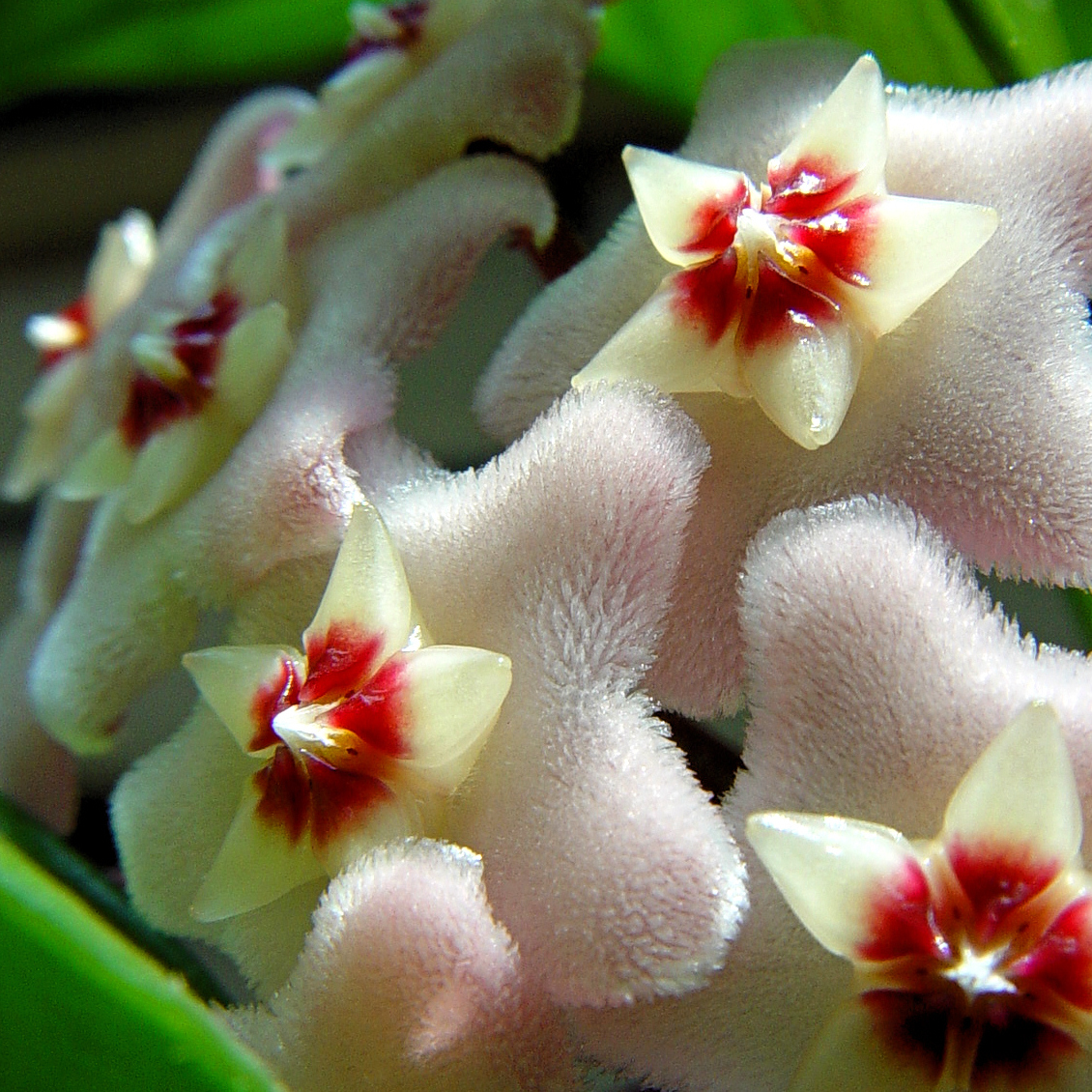
Hoya carnosa

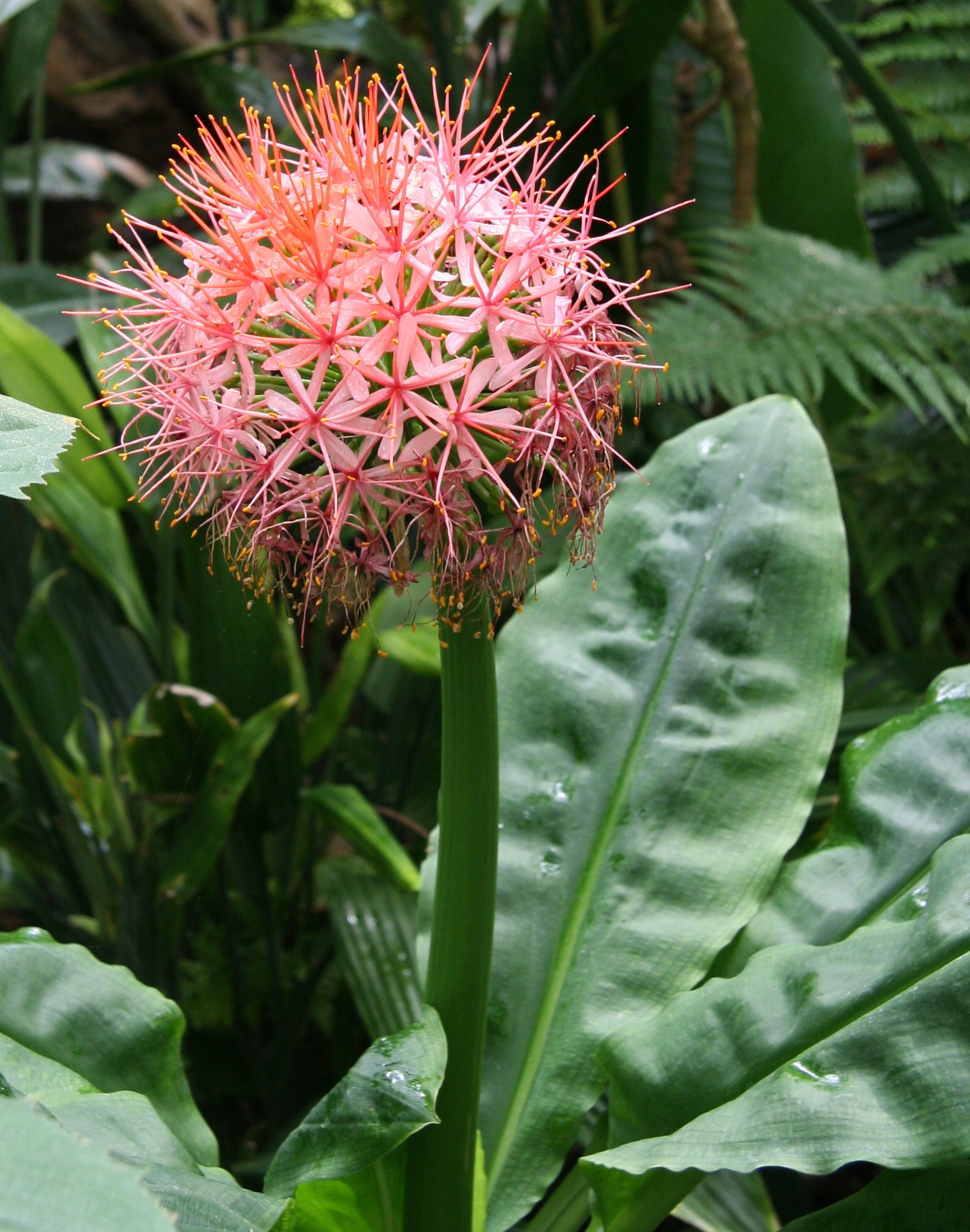
Scadoxus cinnabarinus

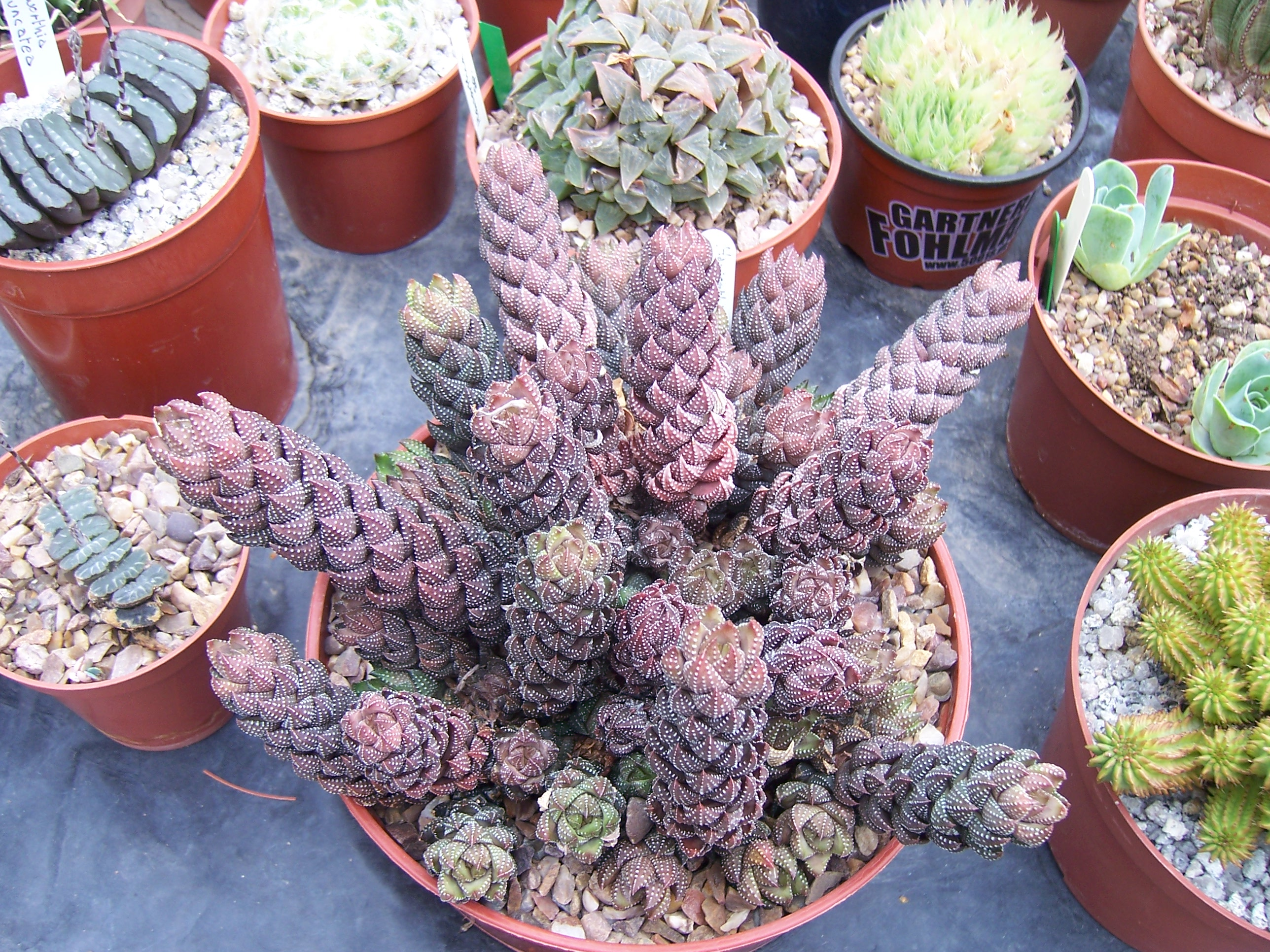
Haworthiopsis coarctata

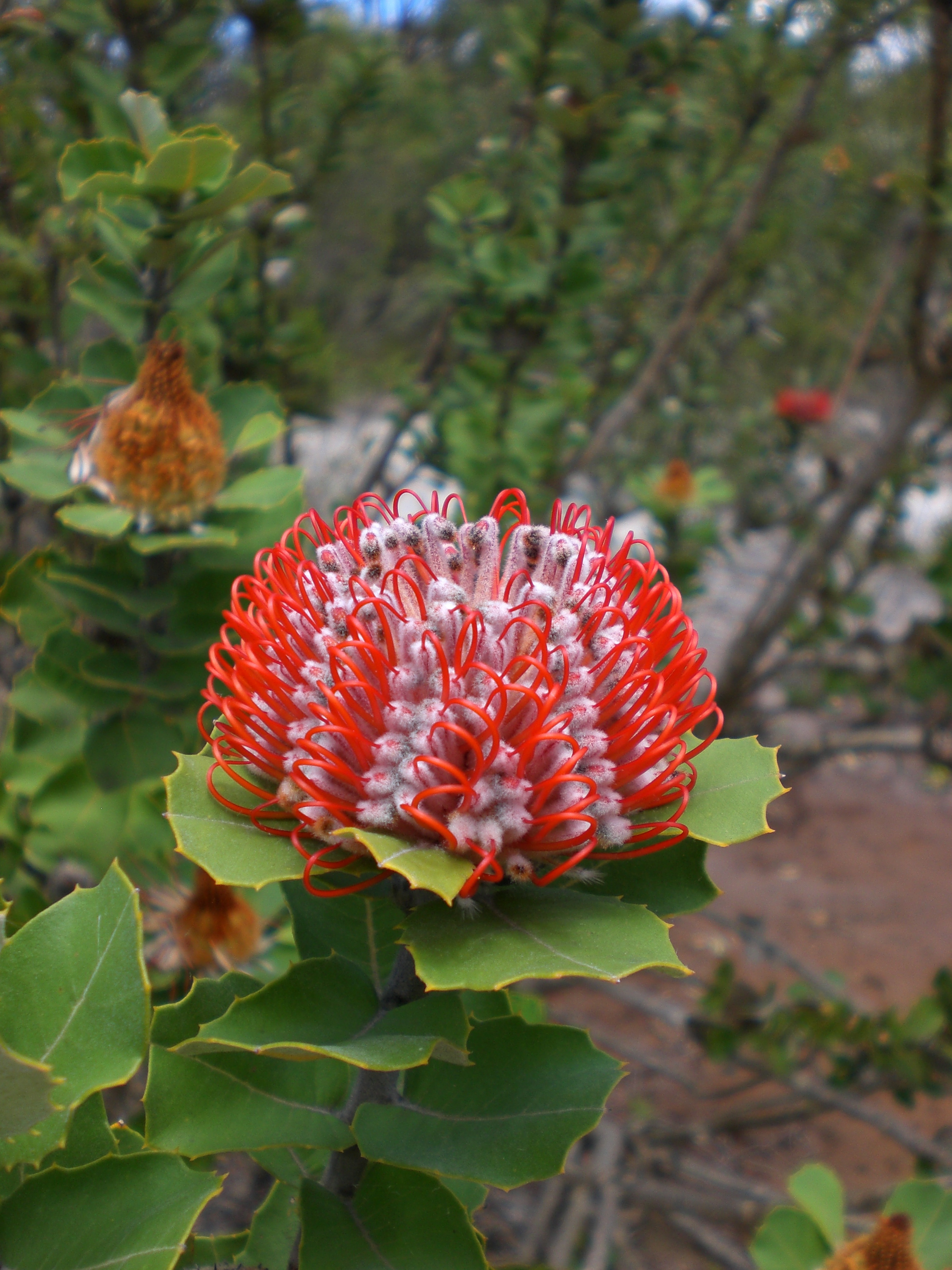
Banksia coccinea

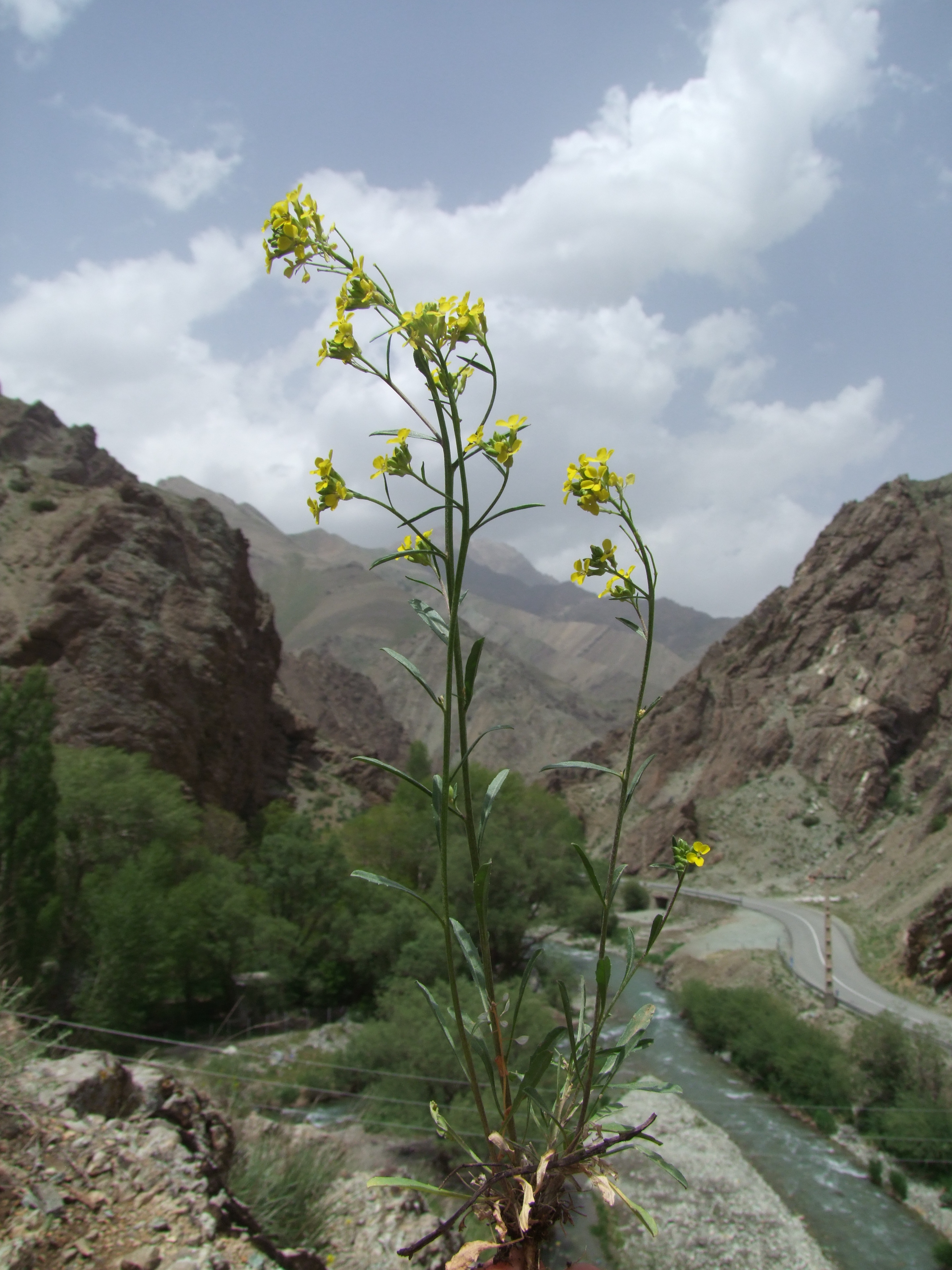
Erysimum collinum

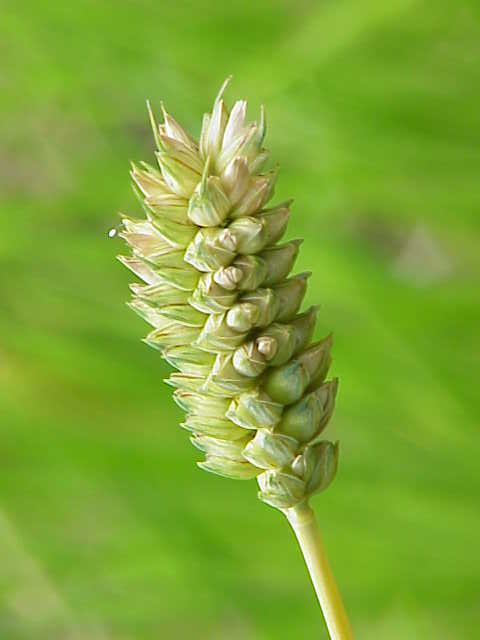
Triticum compactum

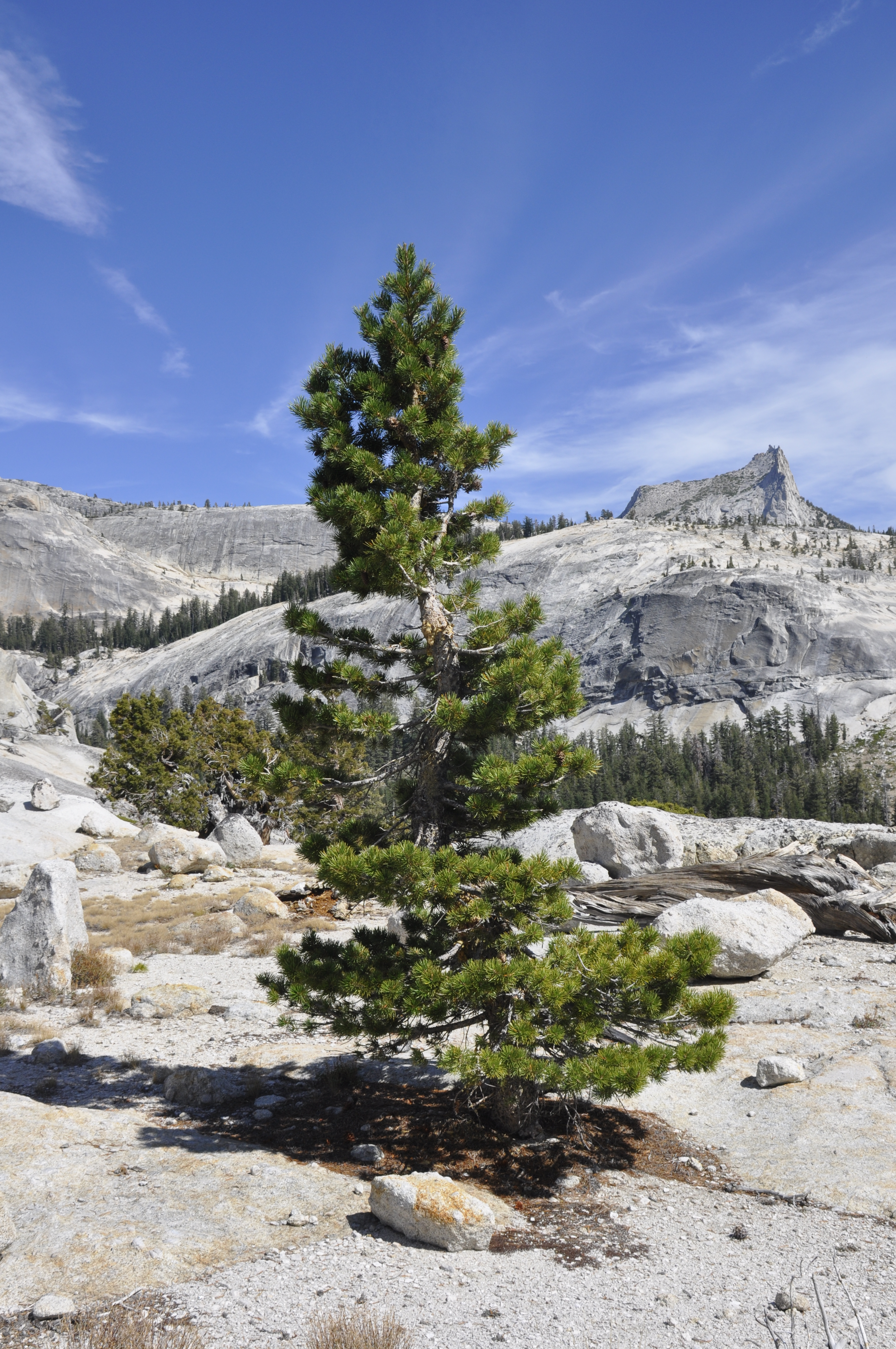
Pinus contorta

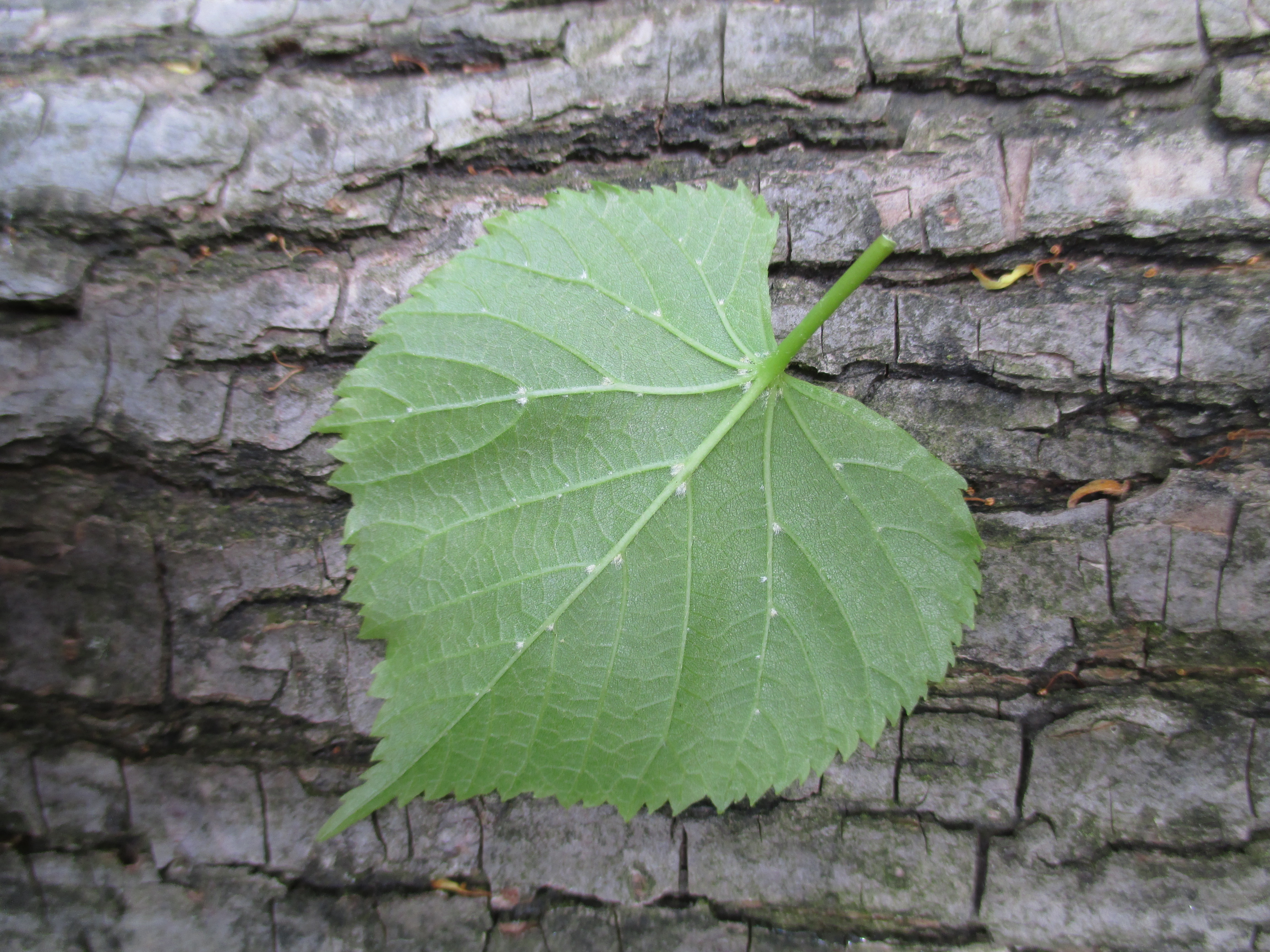
Tilia cordata

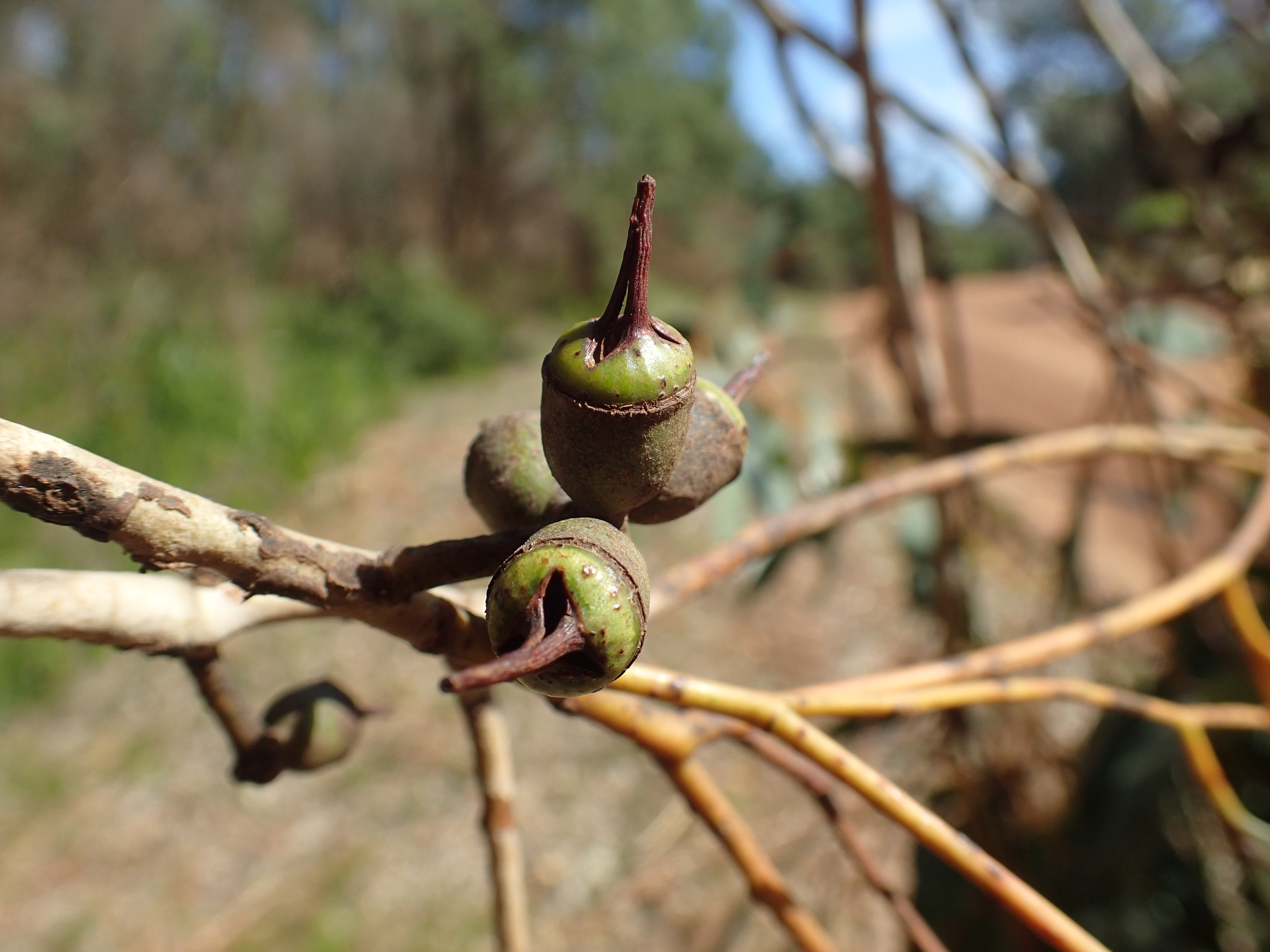
Eucalyptus cornuta

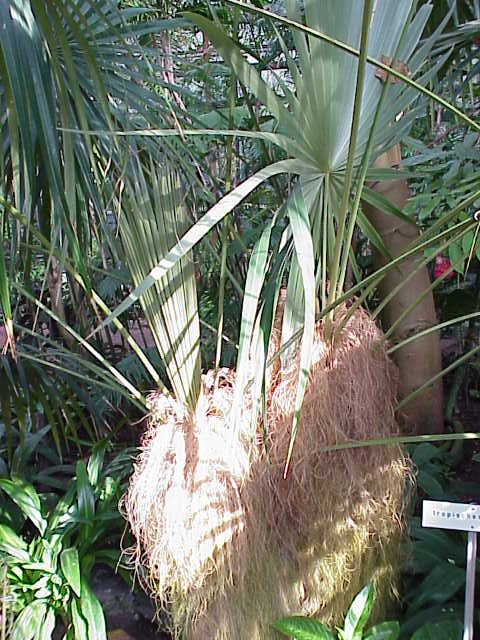
Coccothrinax crinita

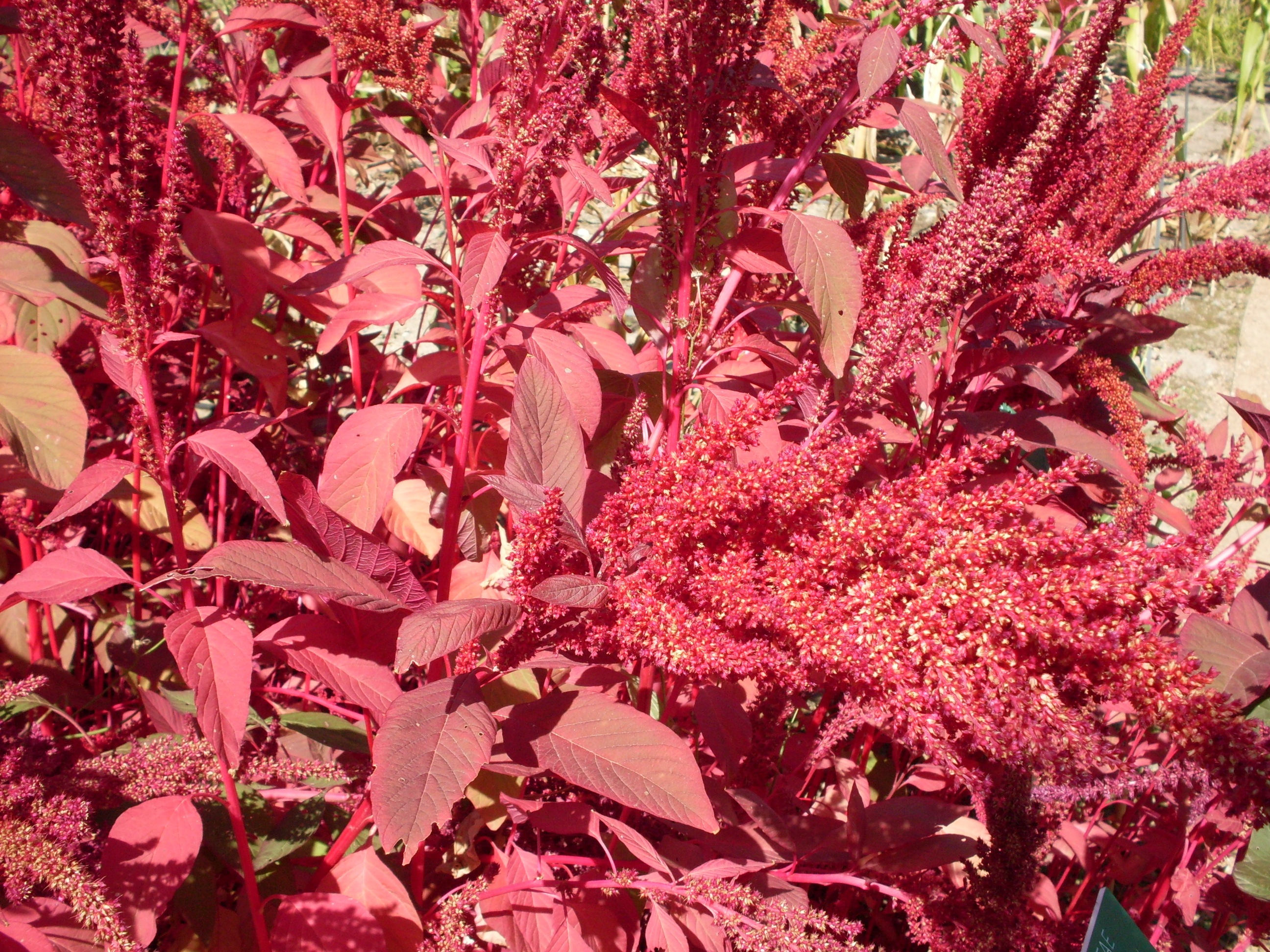
Amaranthus cruentus

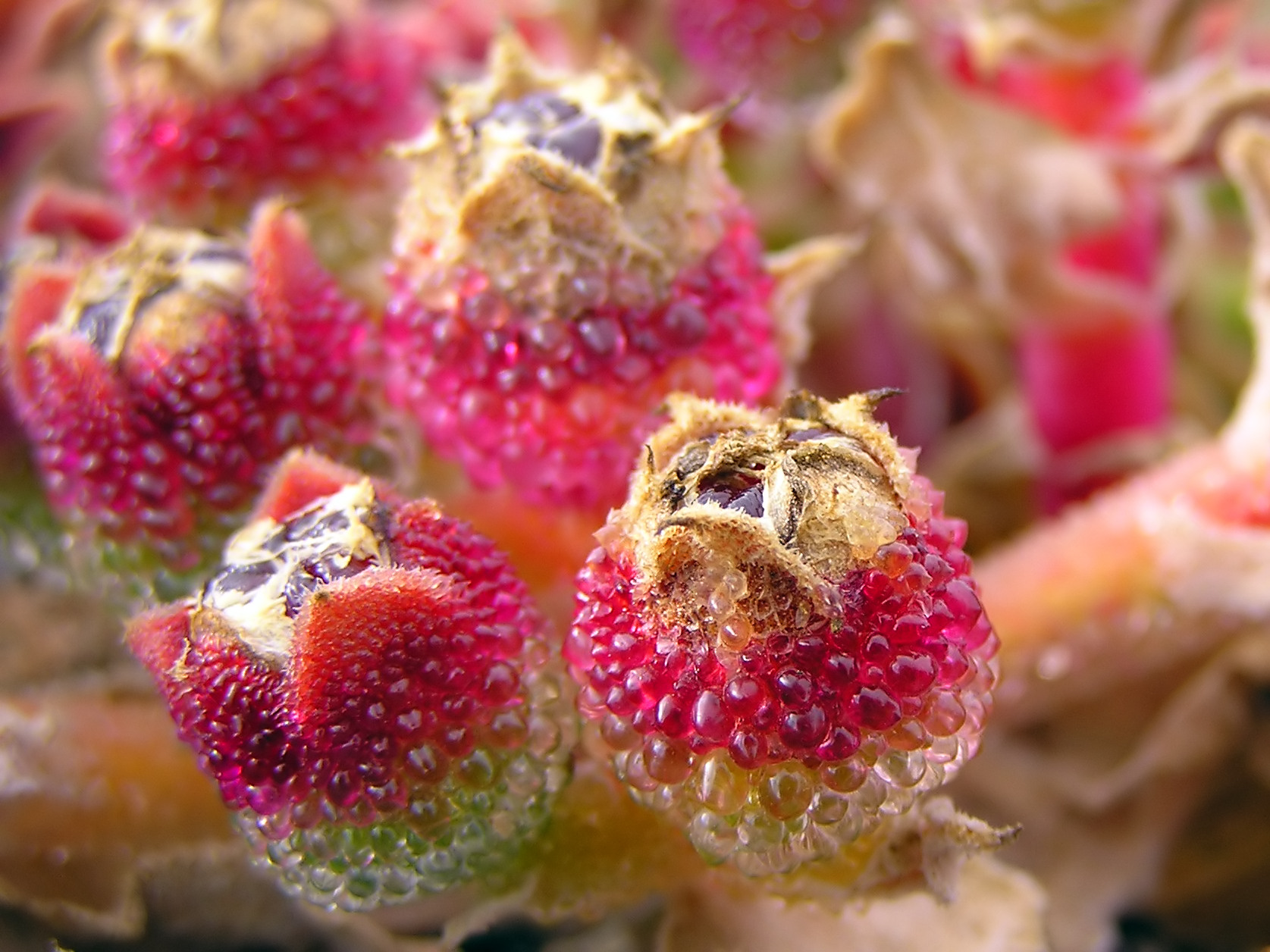
Mesembryanthemum crystallinum

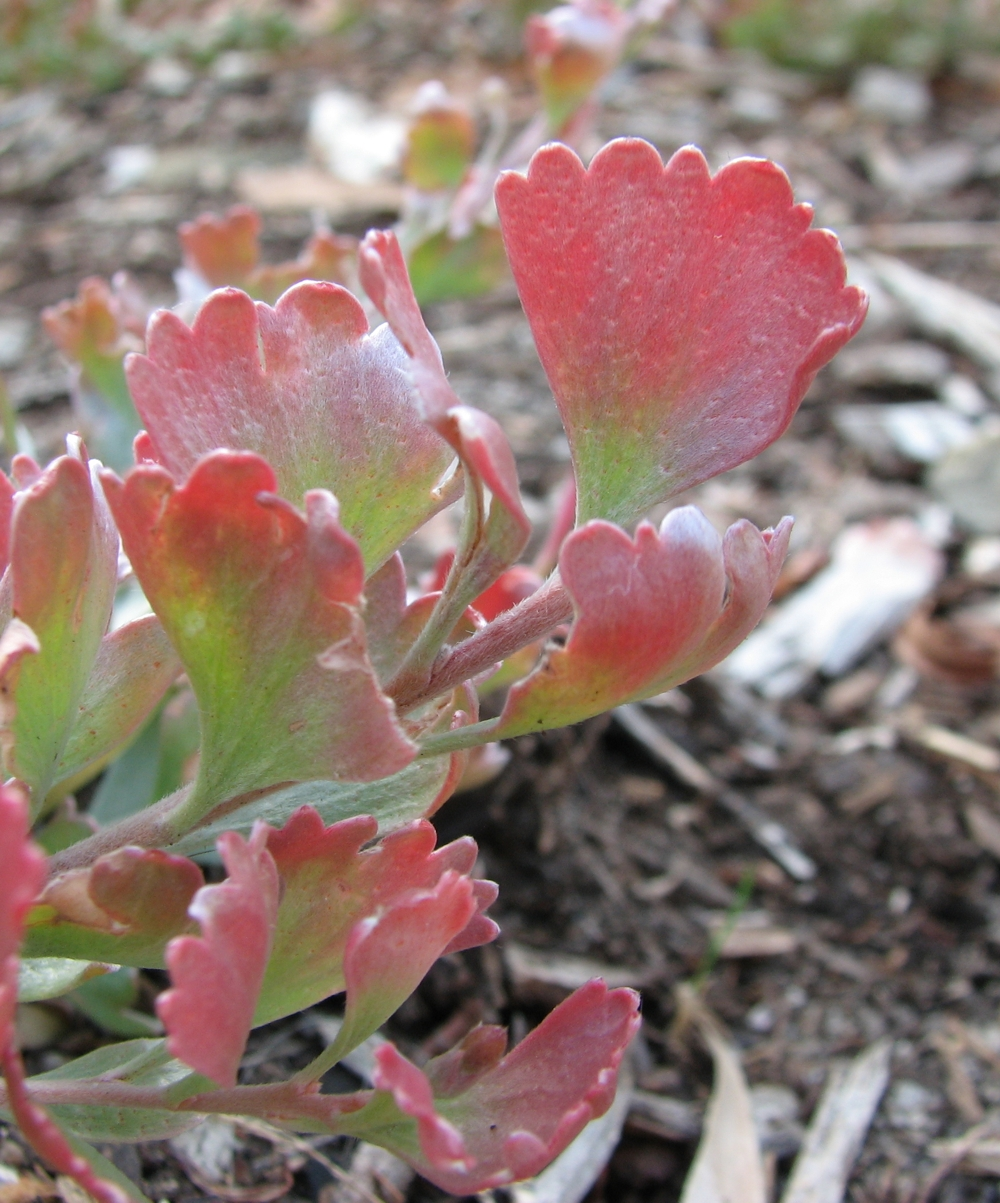
Adenanthos cuneatus

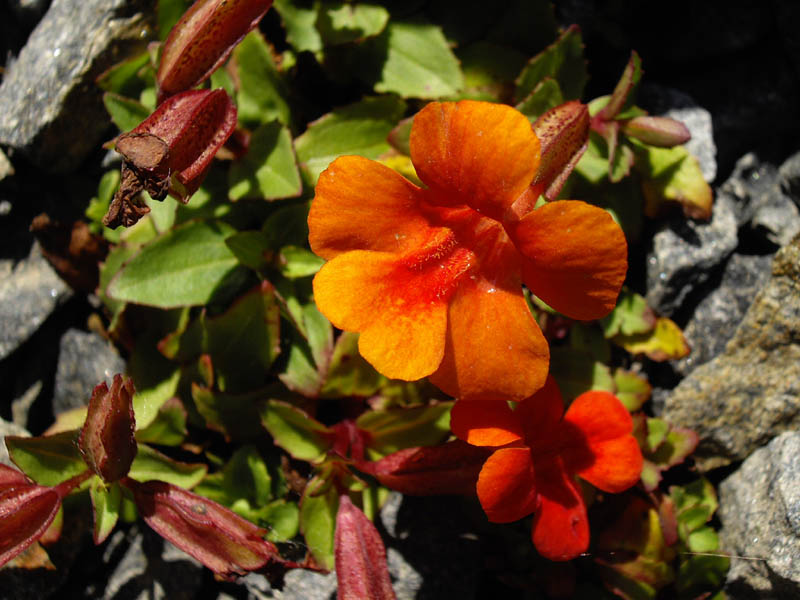
Erythranthe cuprea

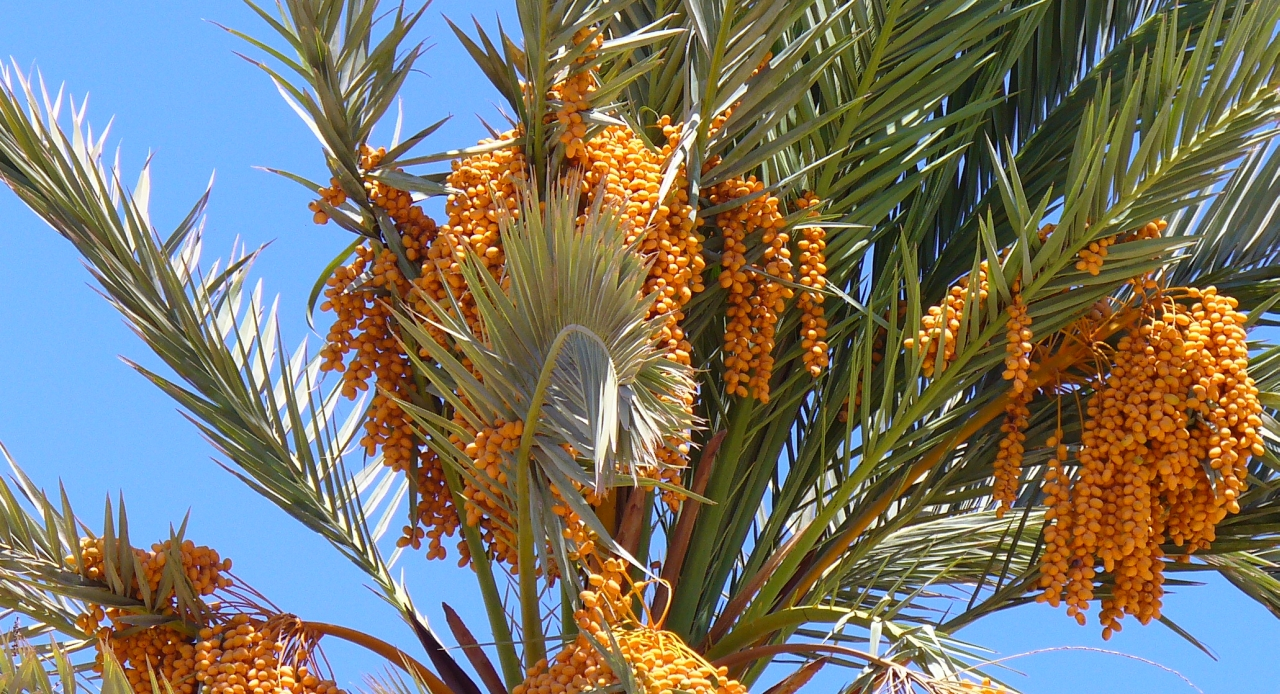
Date palm (Phoenix dactylifera)

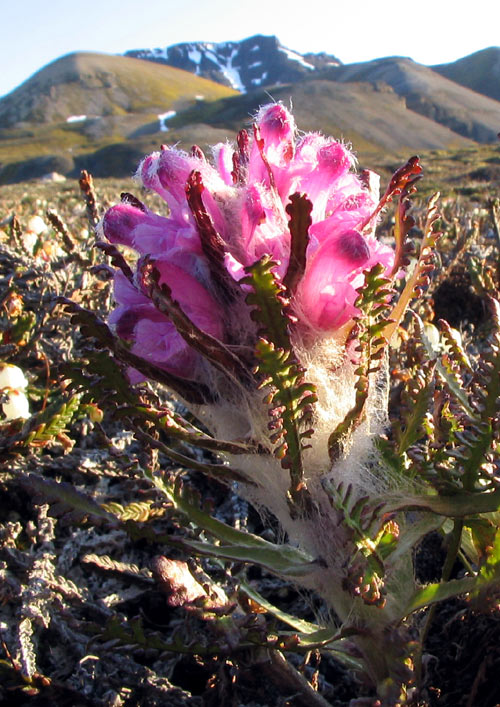
Pedicularis dasyantha

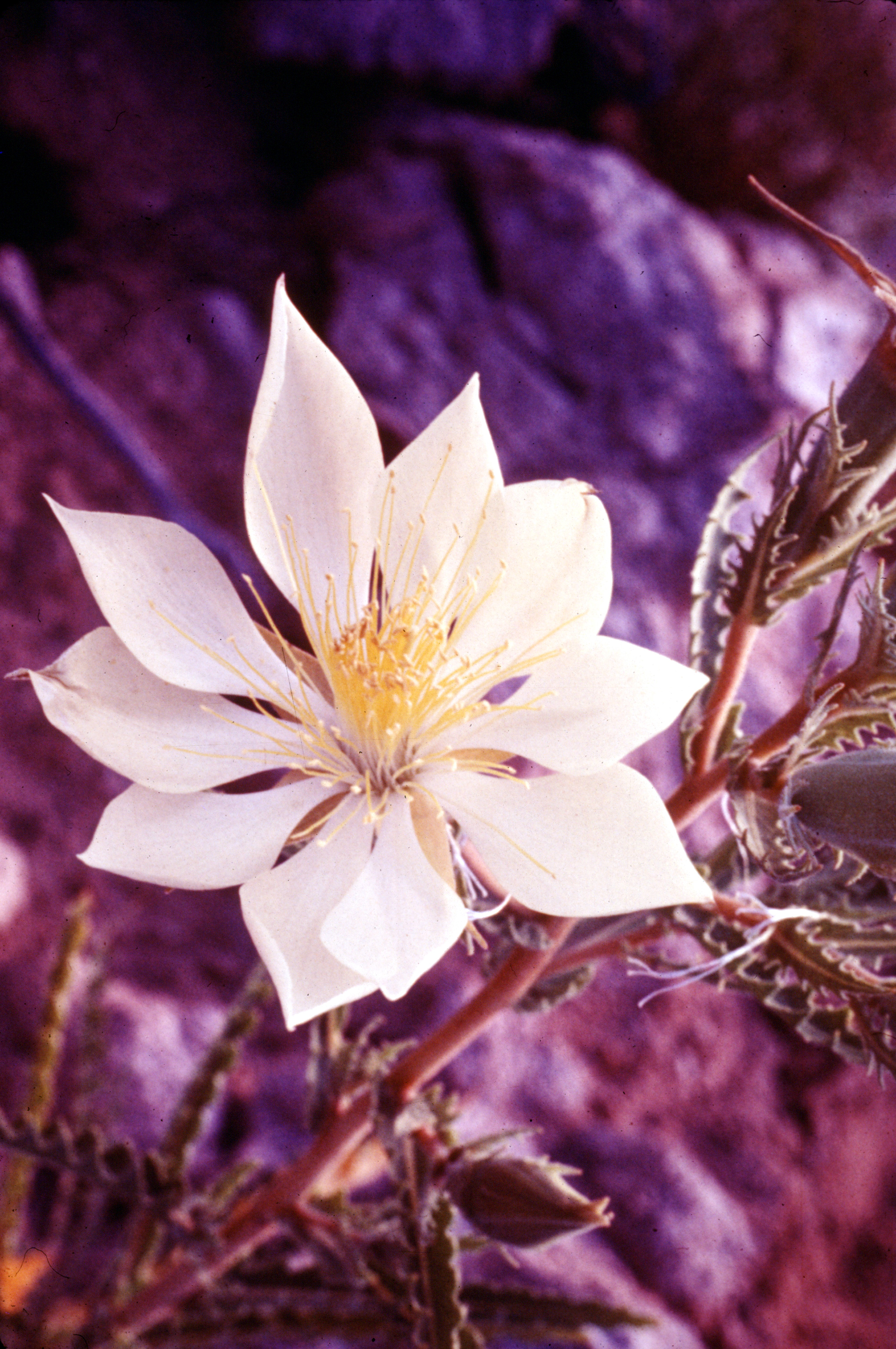
Mentzelia decapetala

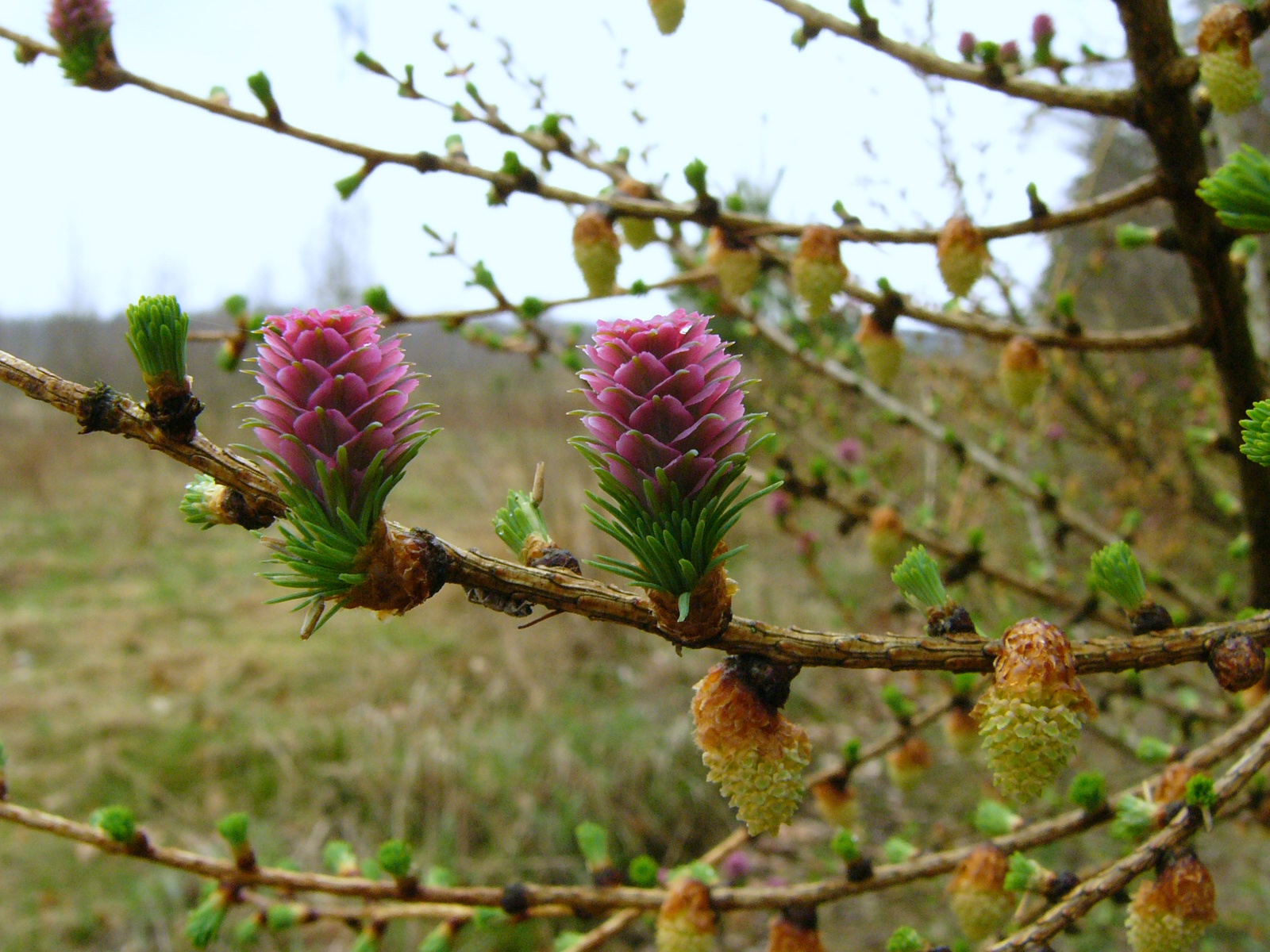
The deciduous coniferous European larch, Larix decidua

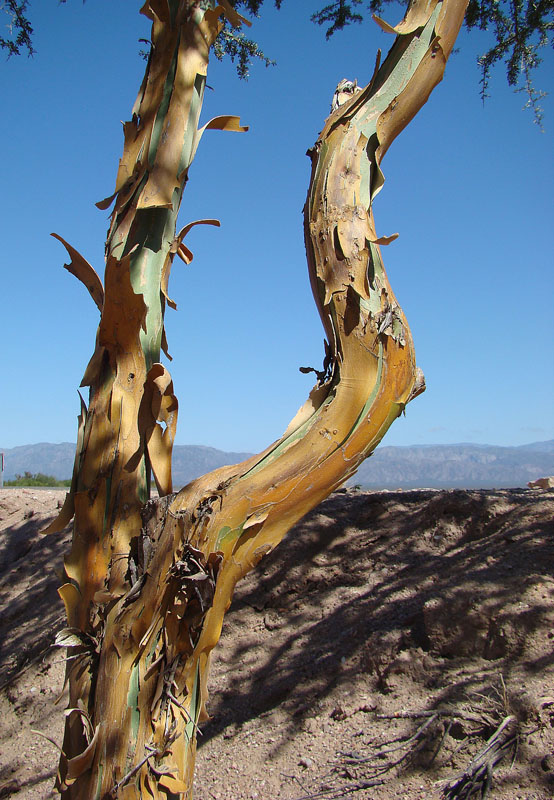
Geoffroea decorticans

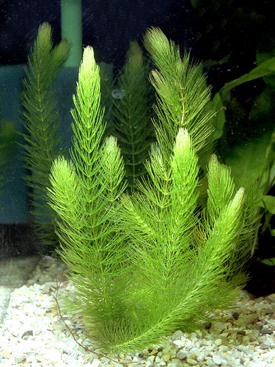
Ceratophyllum demersum

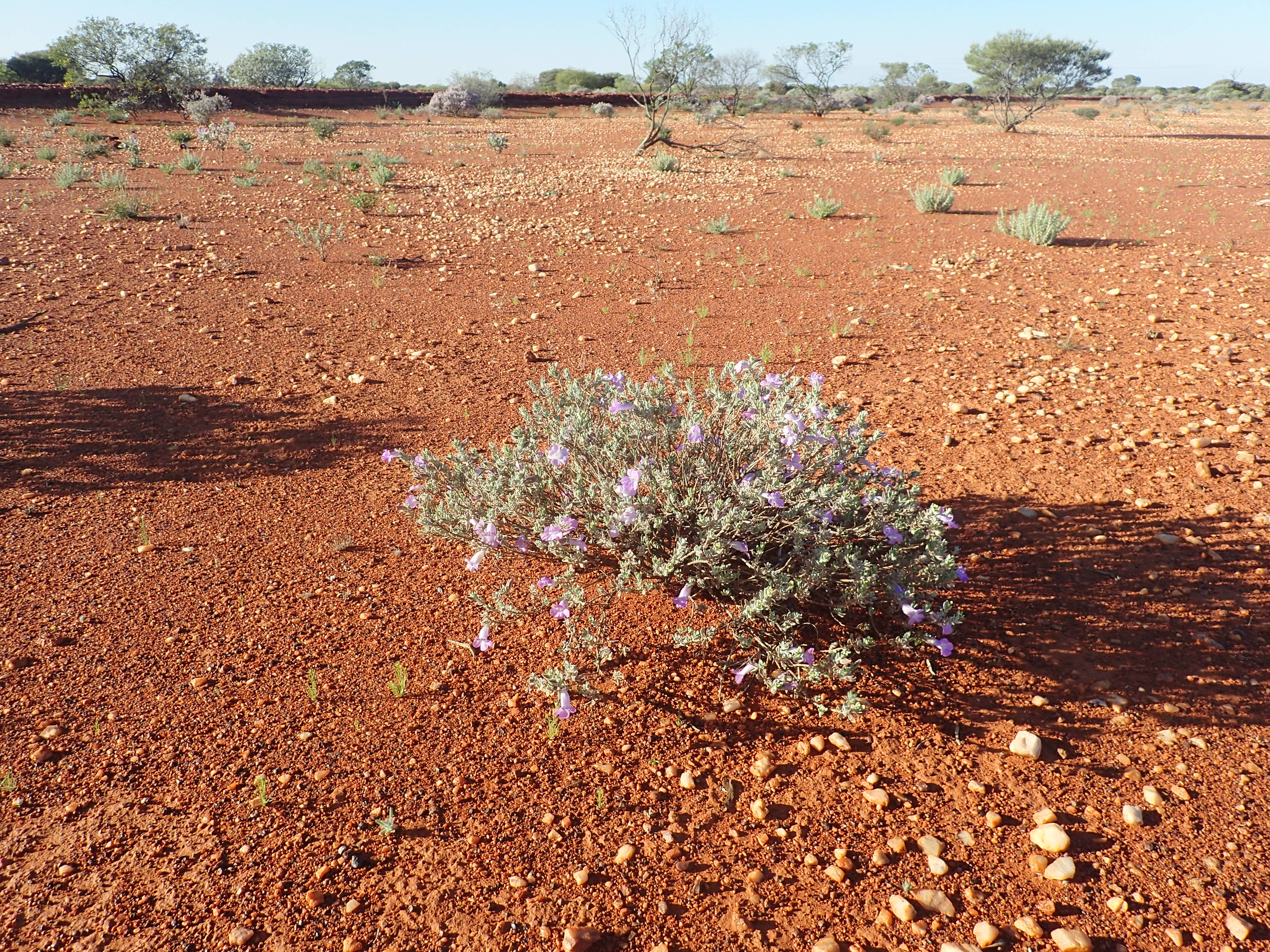
Eremophila demissa

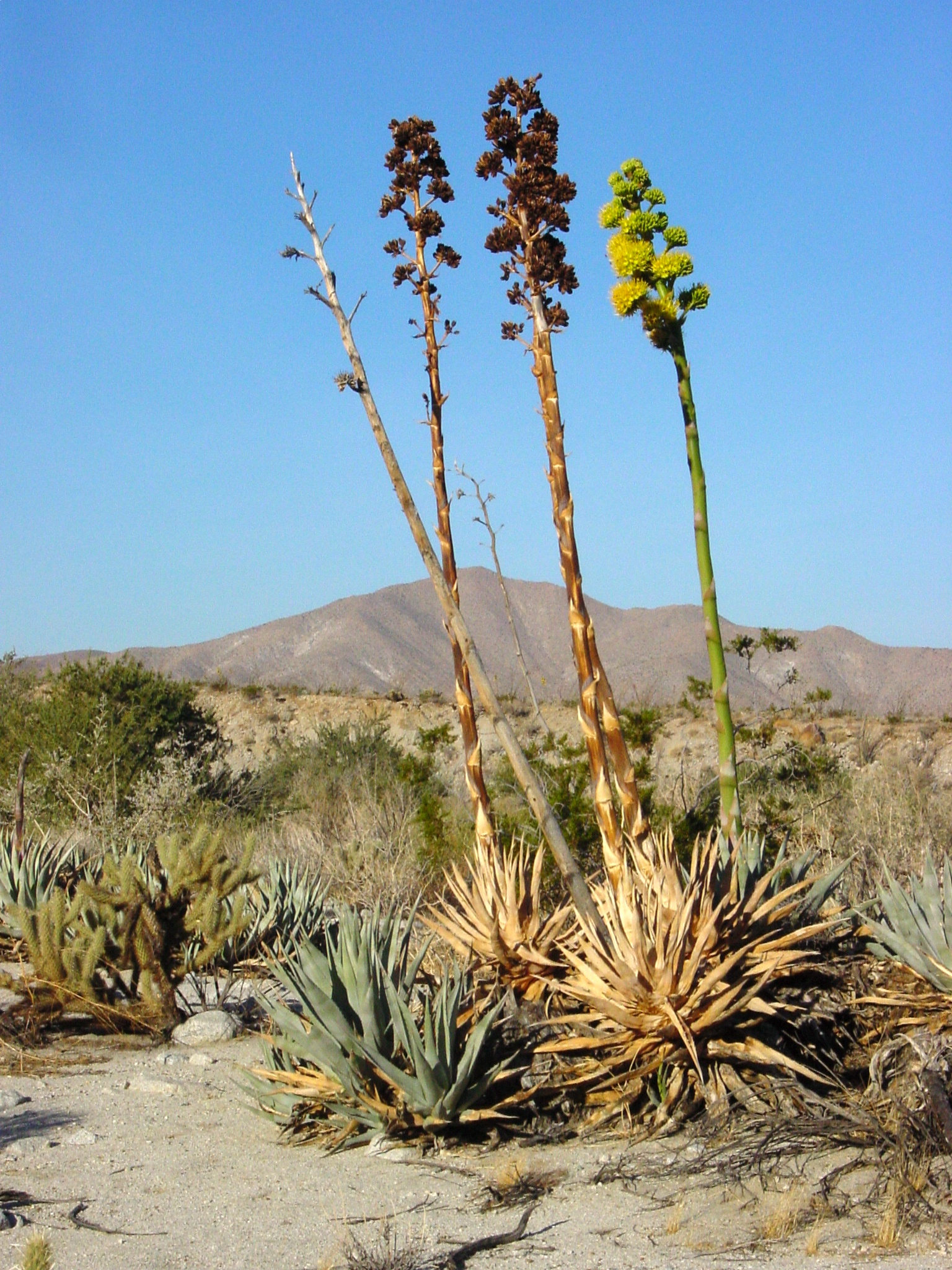
Agave deserti

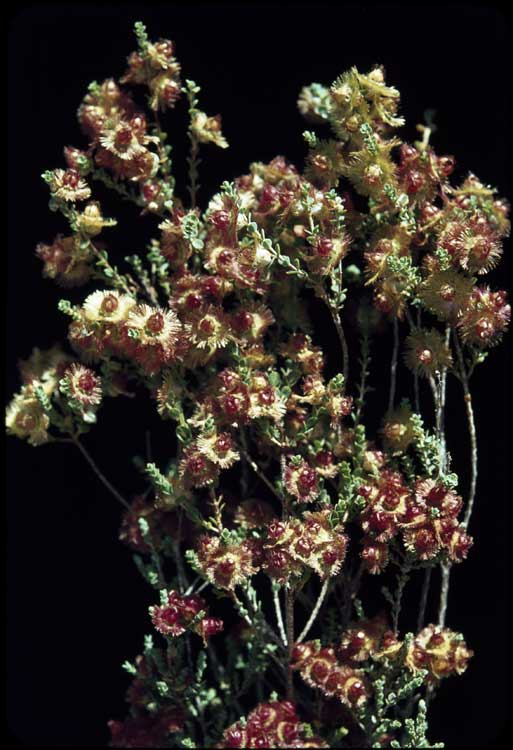
Verticordia dichroma

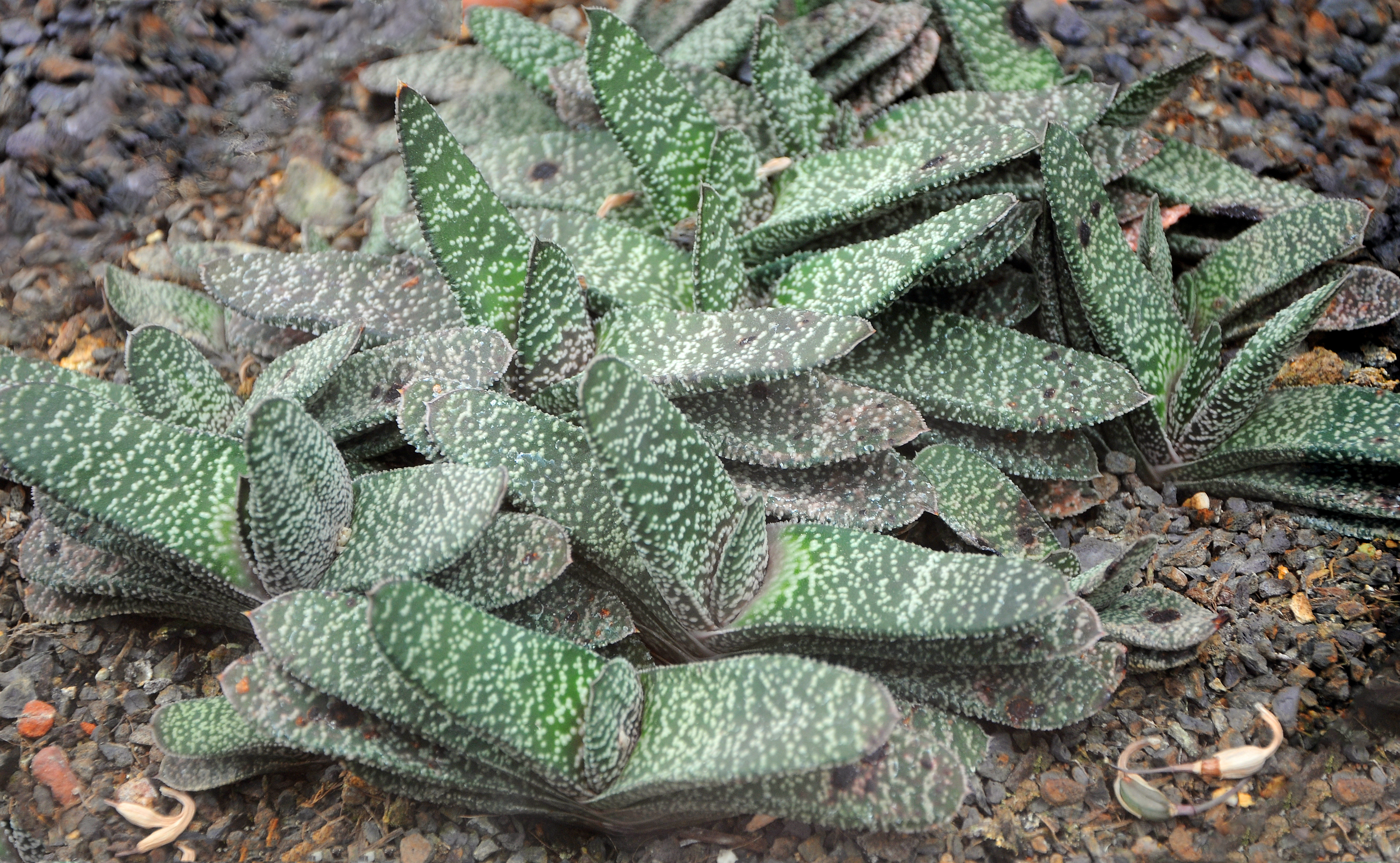
Gasteria disticha

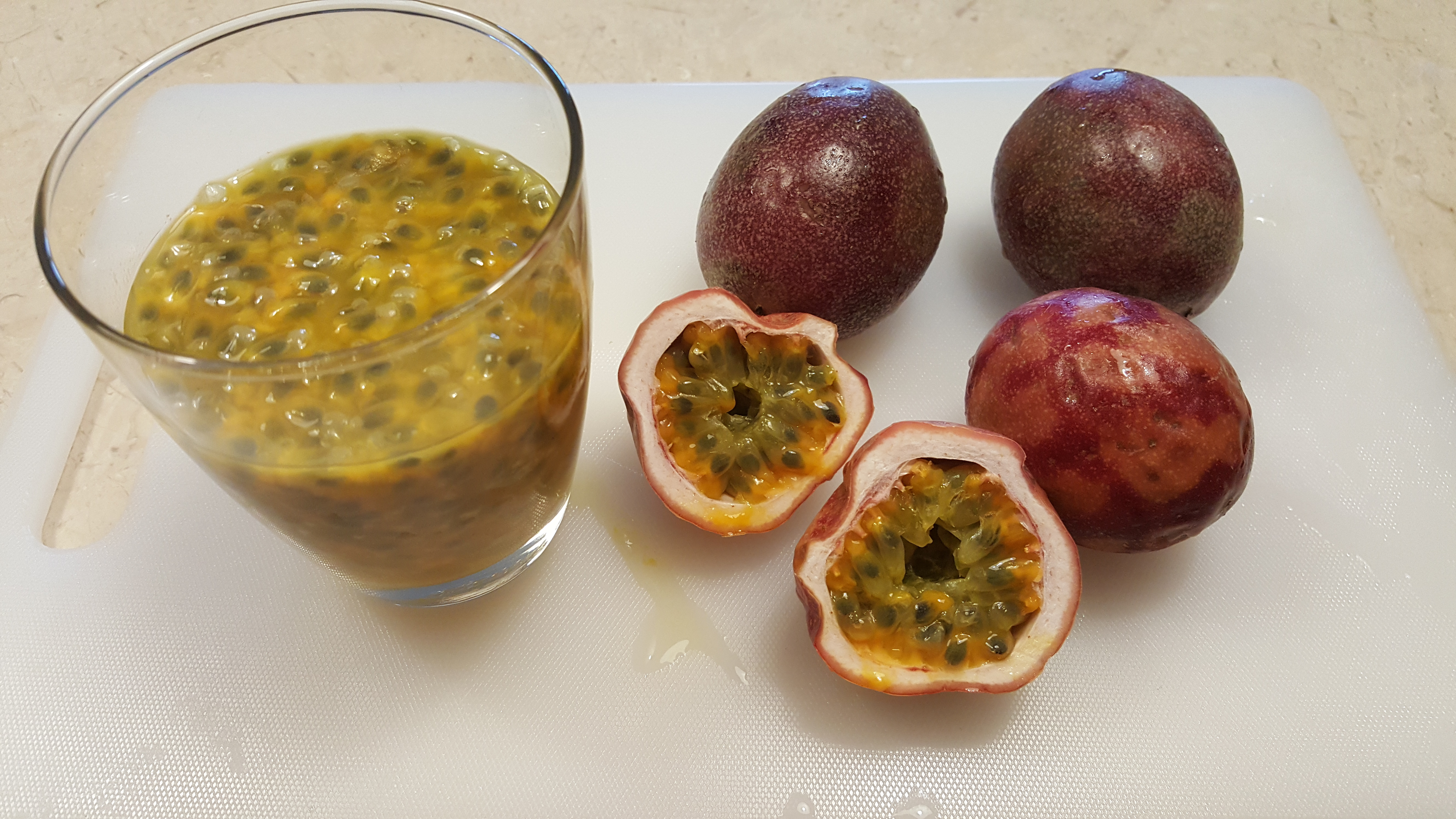
Passiflora edulis

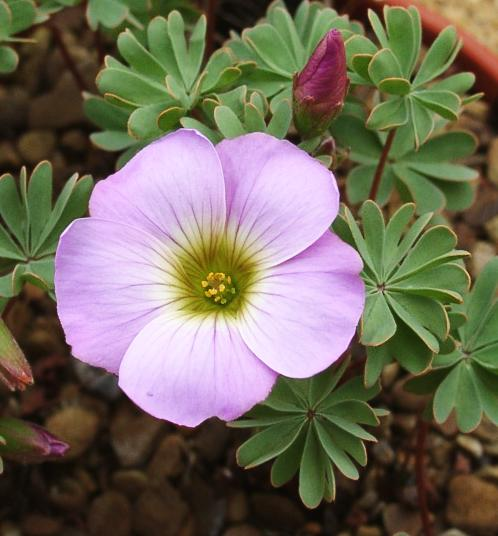
Oxalis enneaphylla

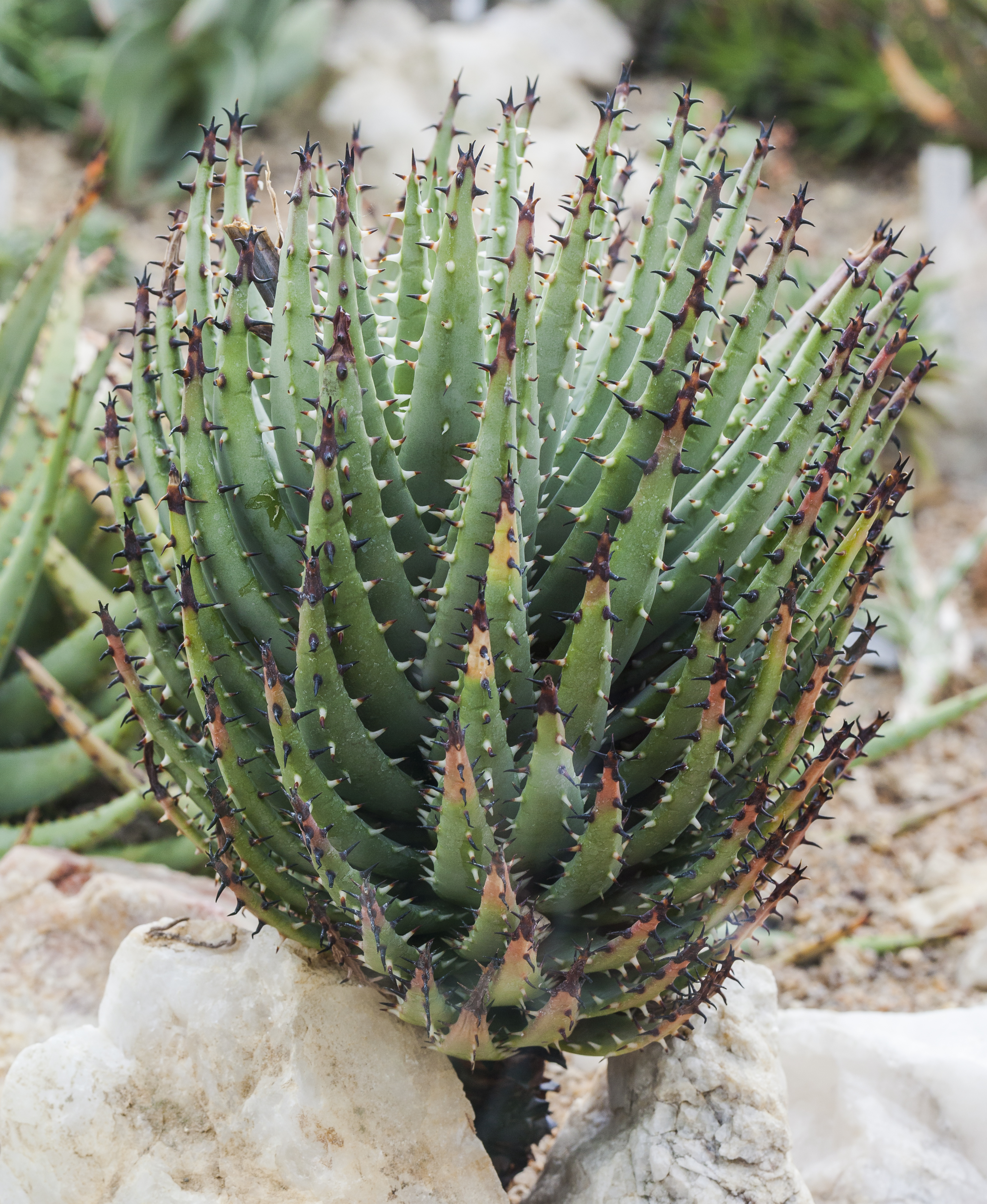
Aloe erinacea

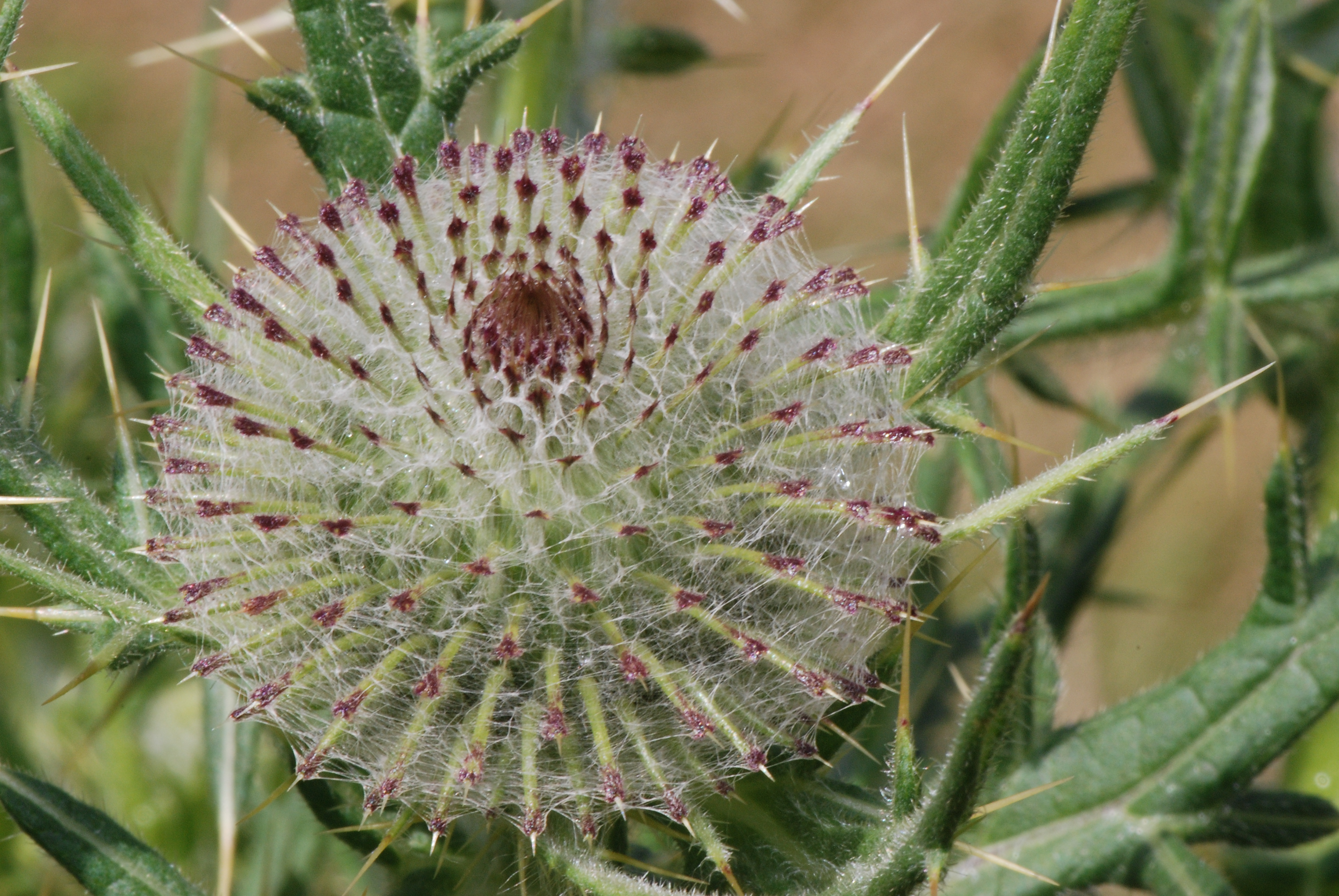
Cirsium eriophorum

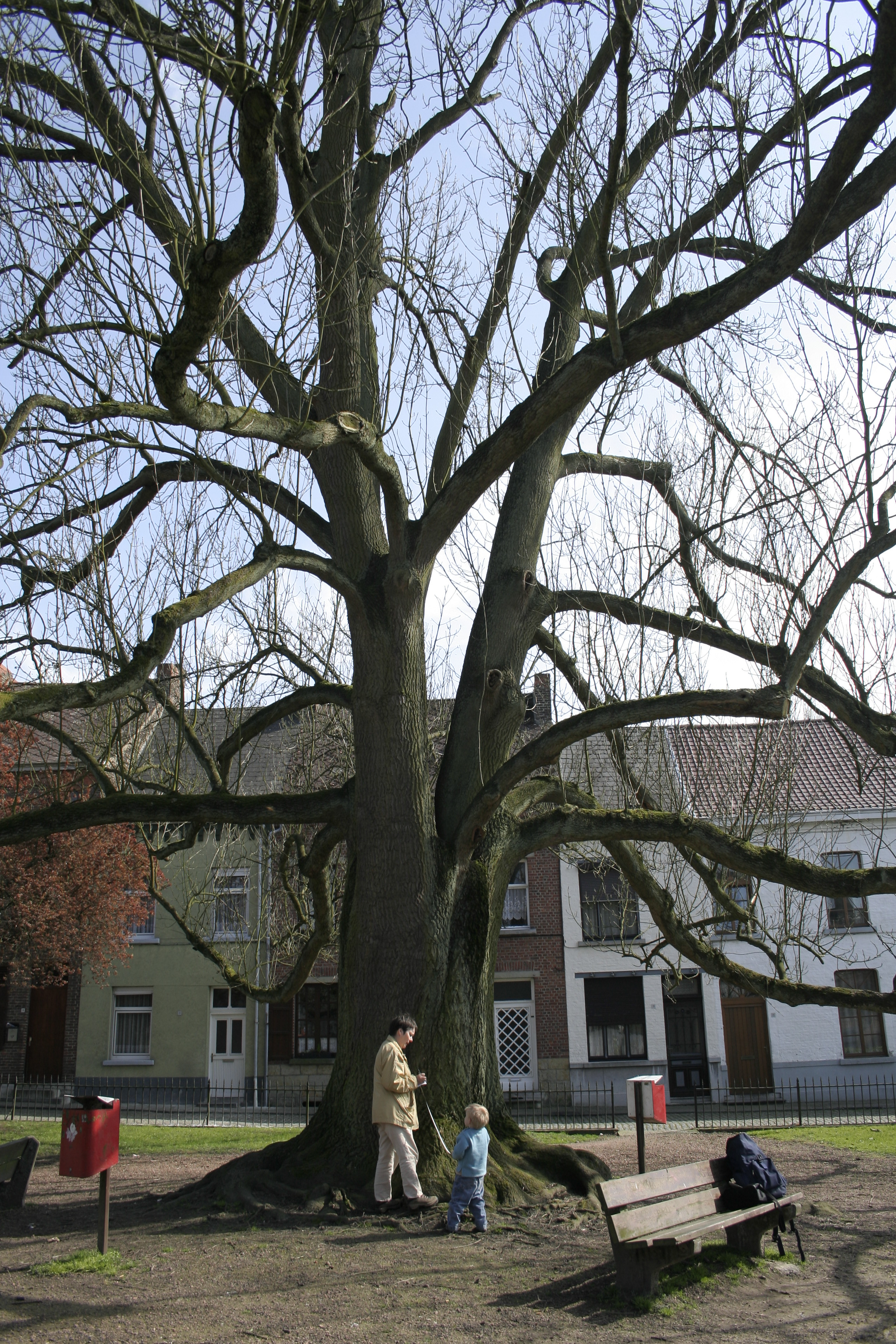
Fraxinus excelsior

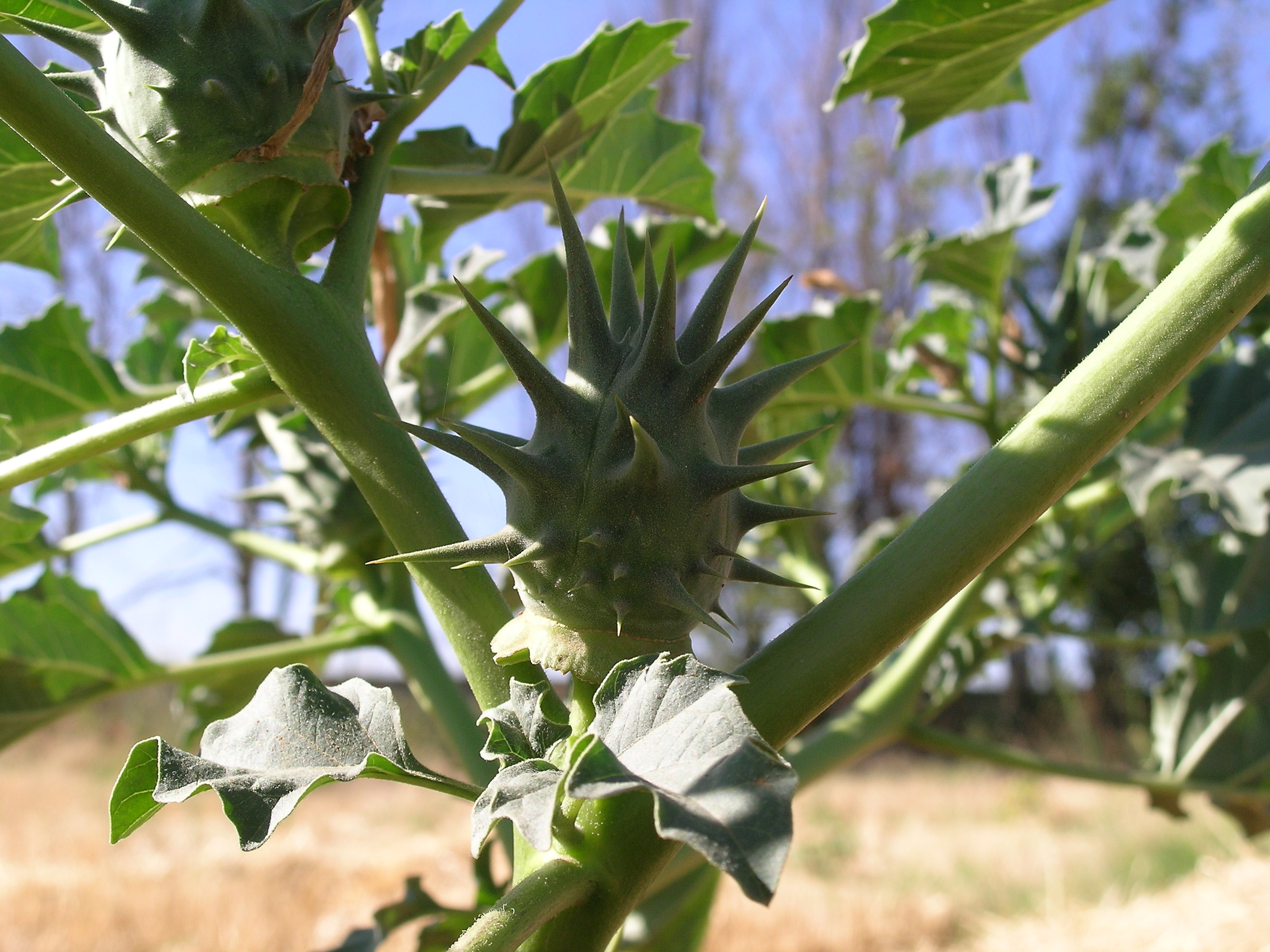
Datura ferox

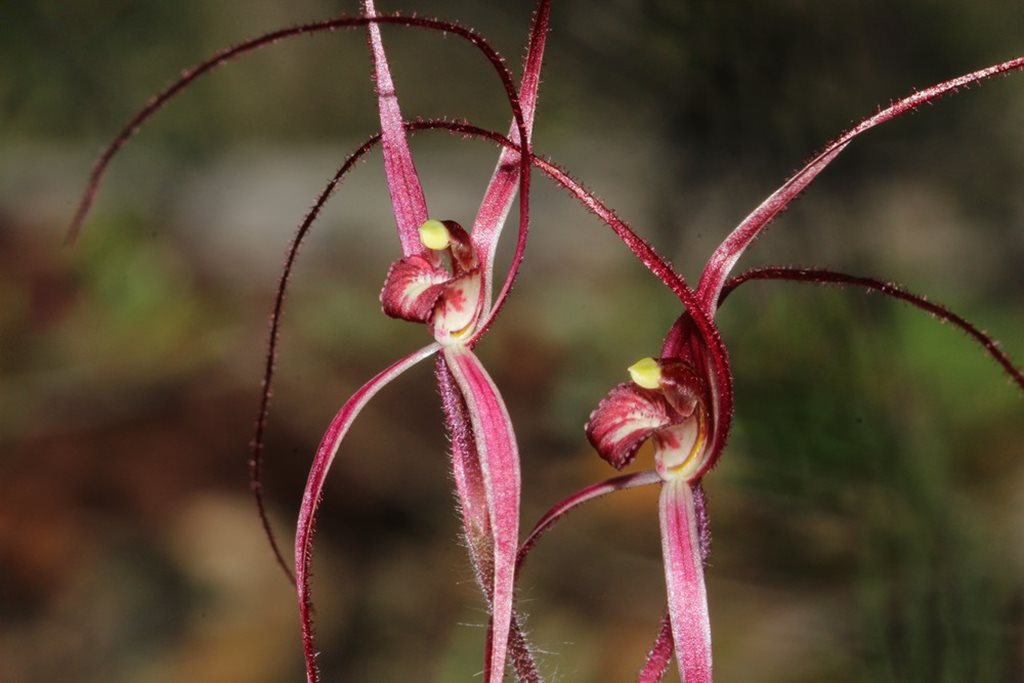
Caladenia filamentosa

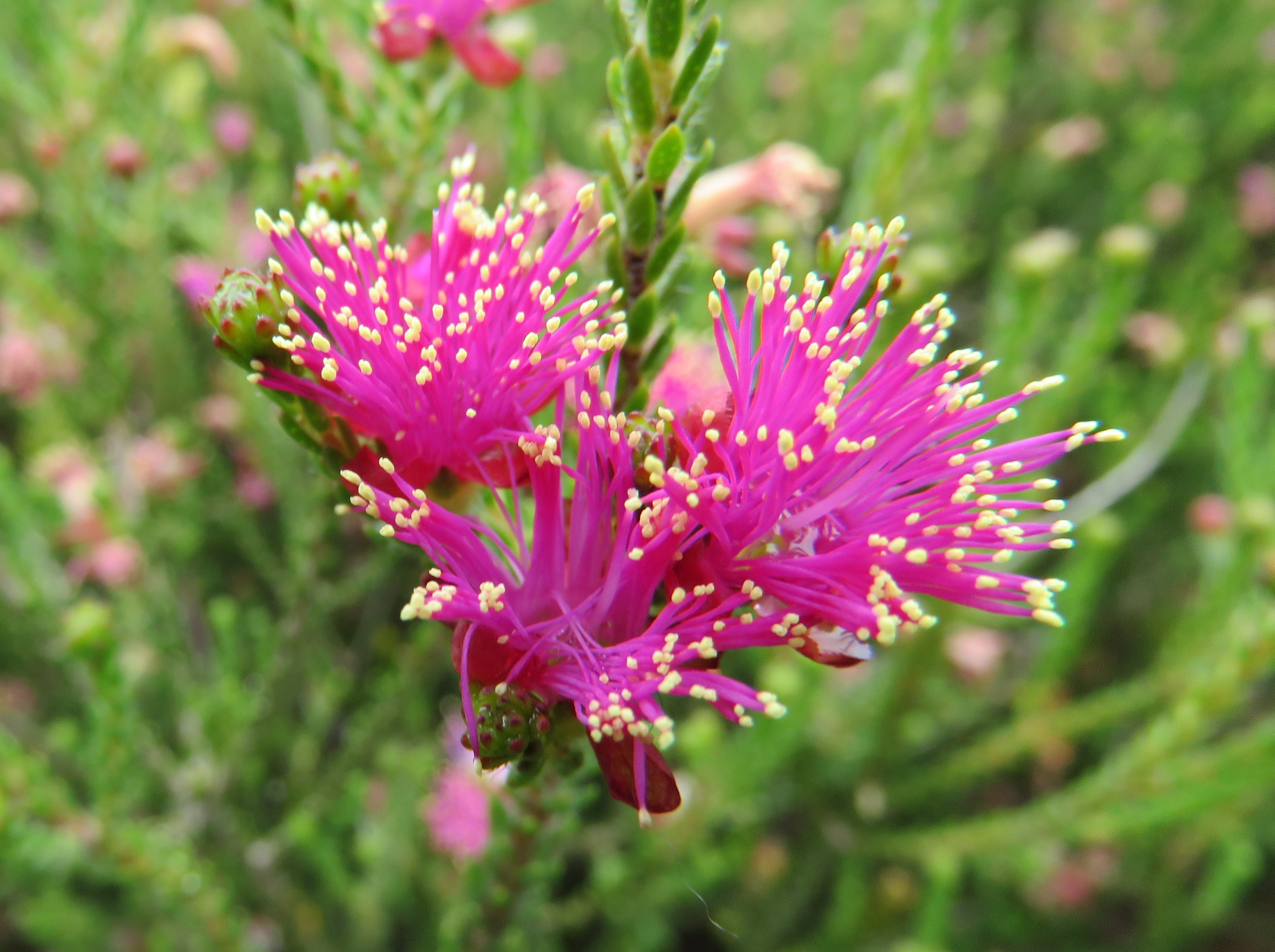
Eremaea fimbriata

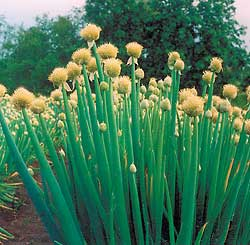
Allium fistulosum

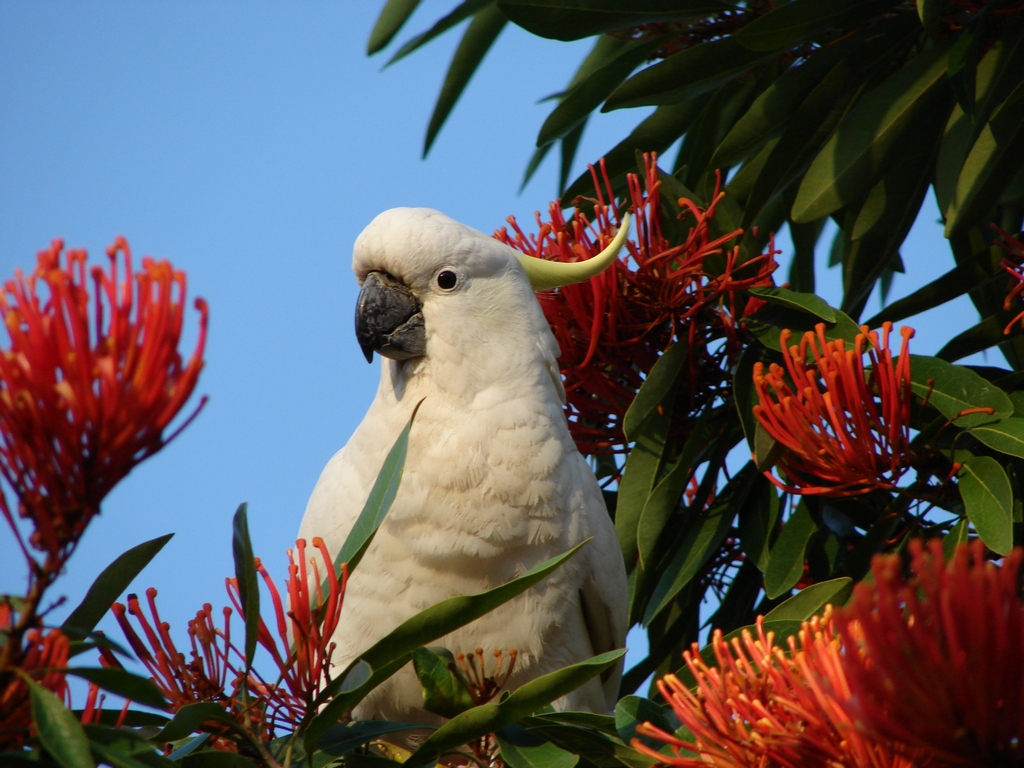
Alloxylon flammeum

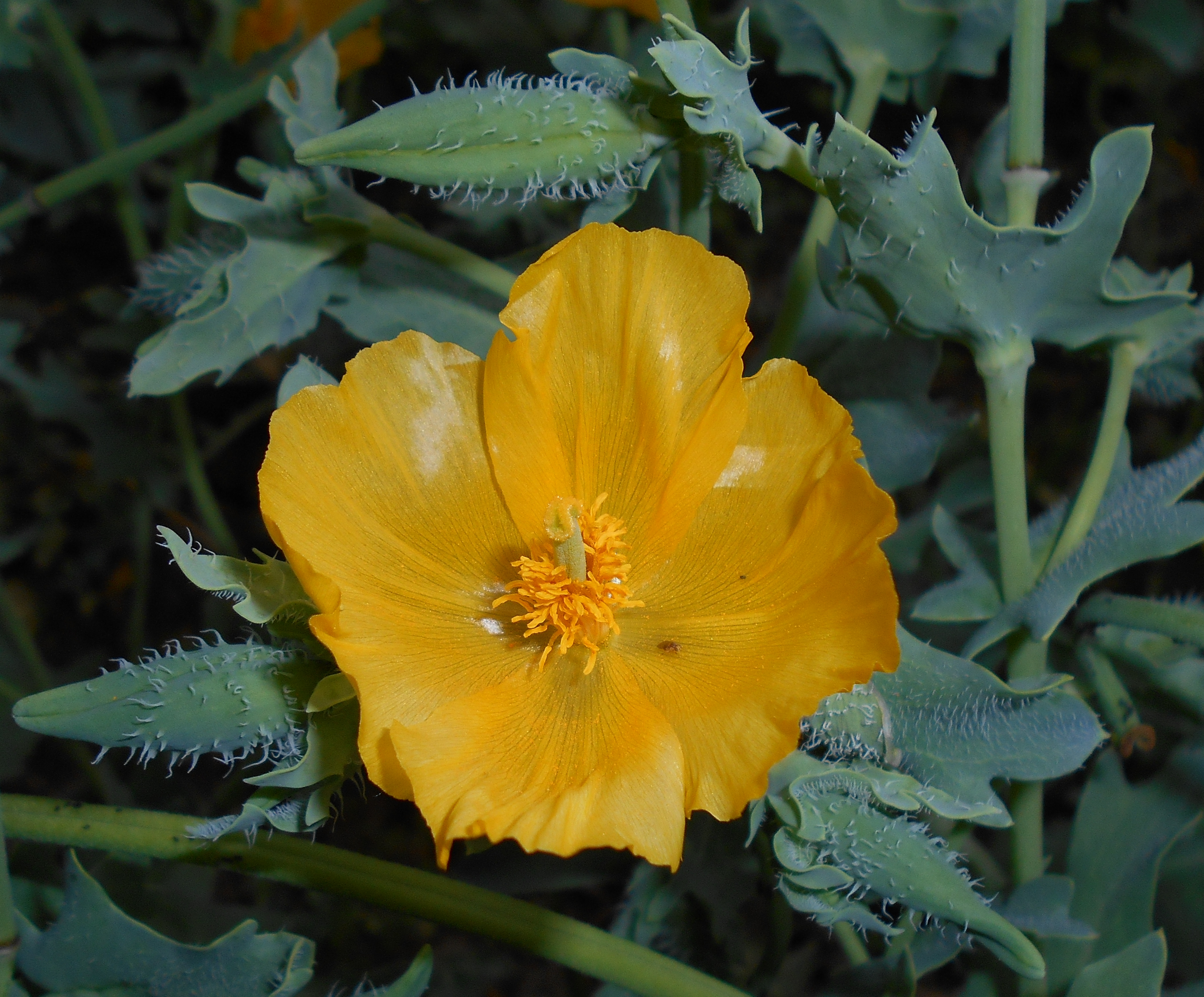
Glaucium flavum

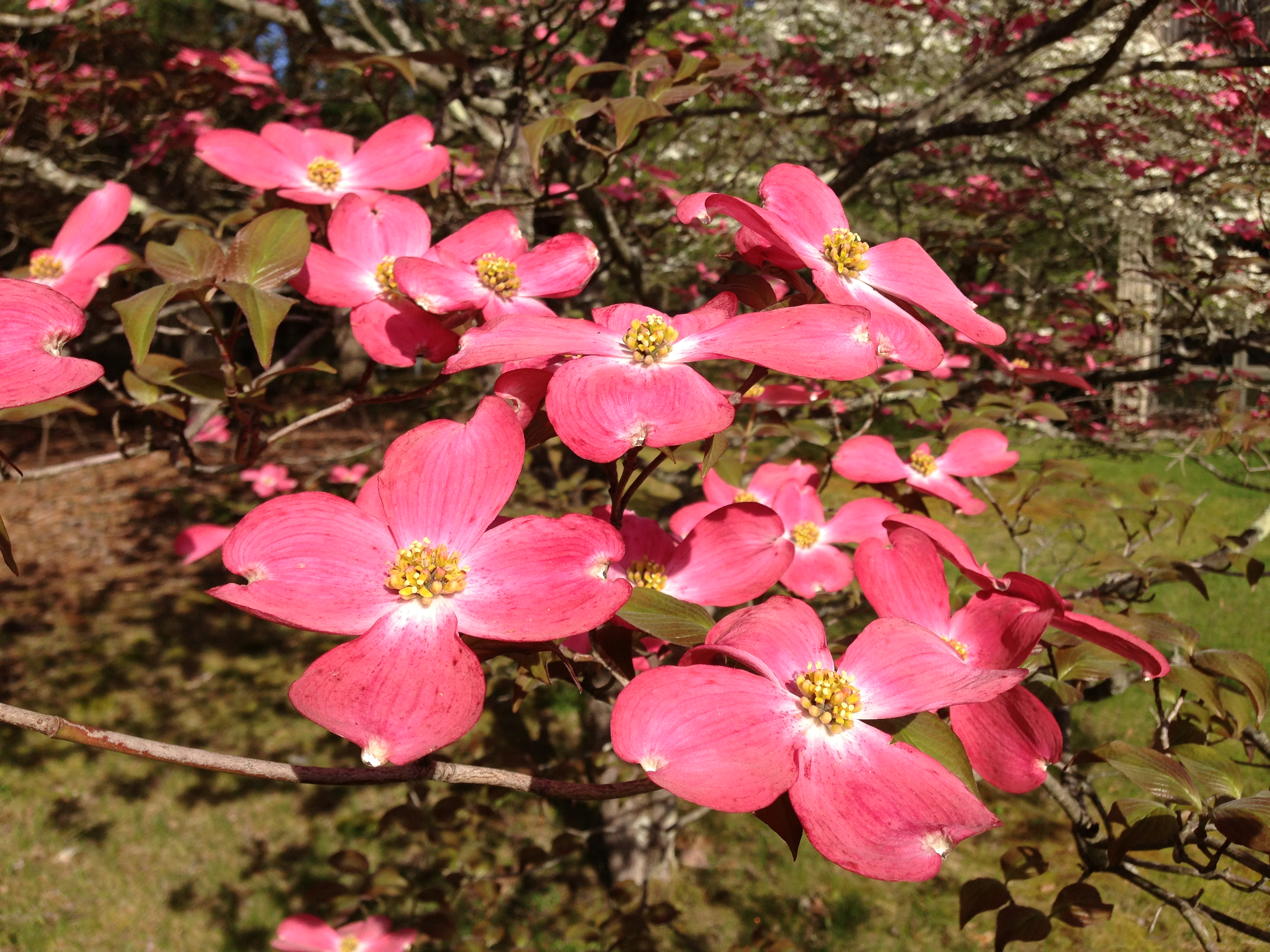
Cornus florida

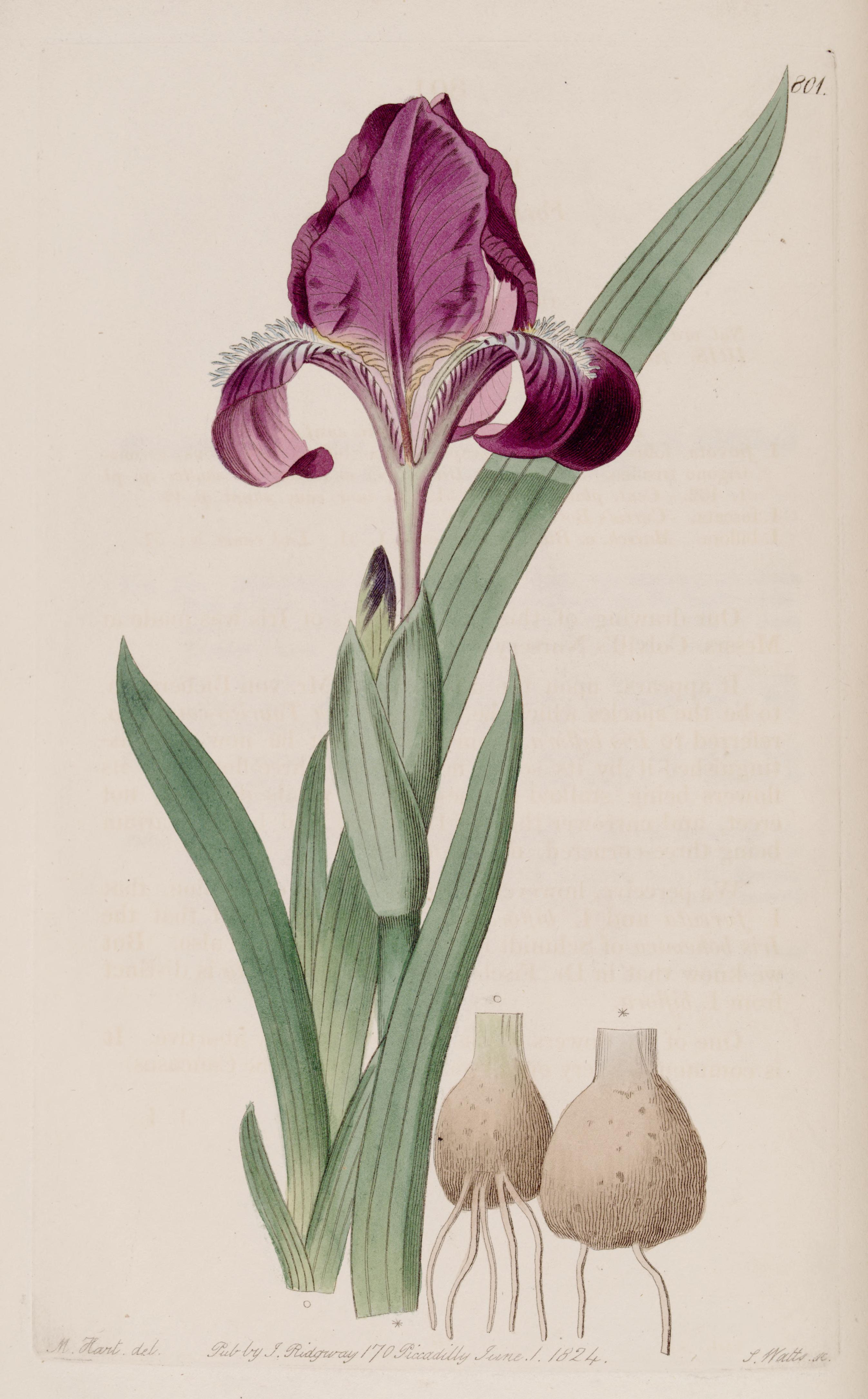
Illustration of Iris furcata

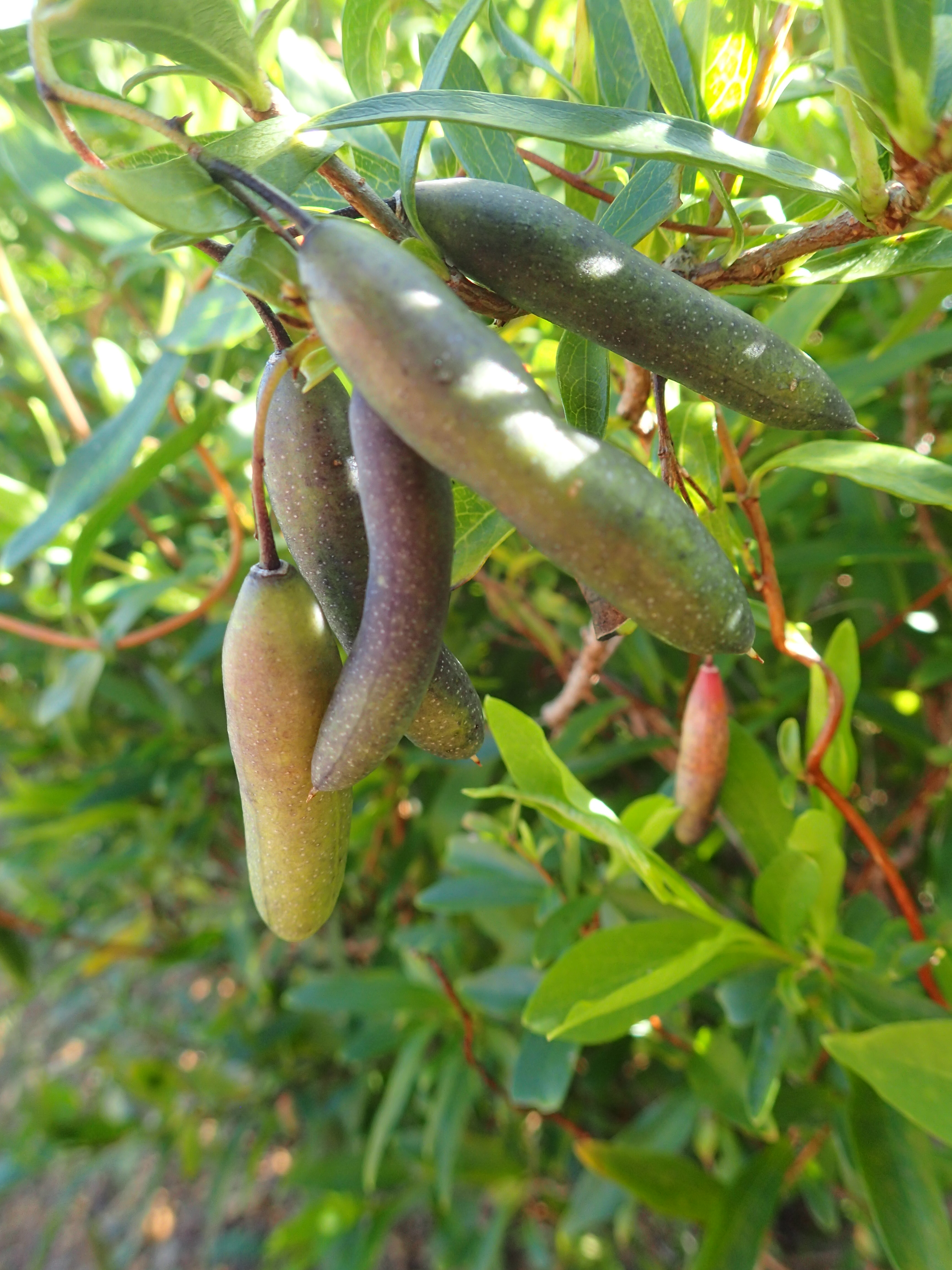
Billardiera fusiformis

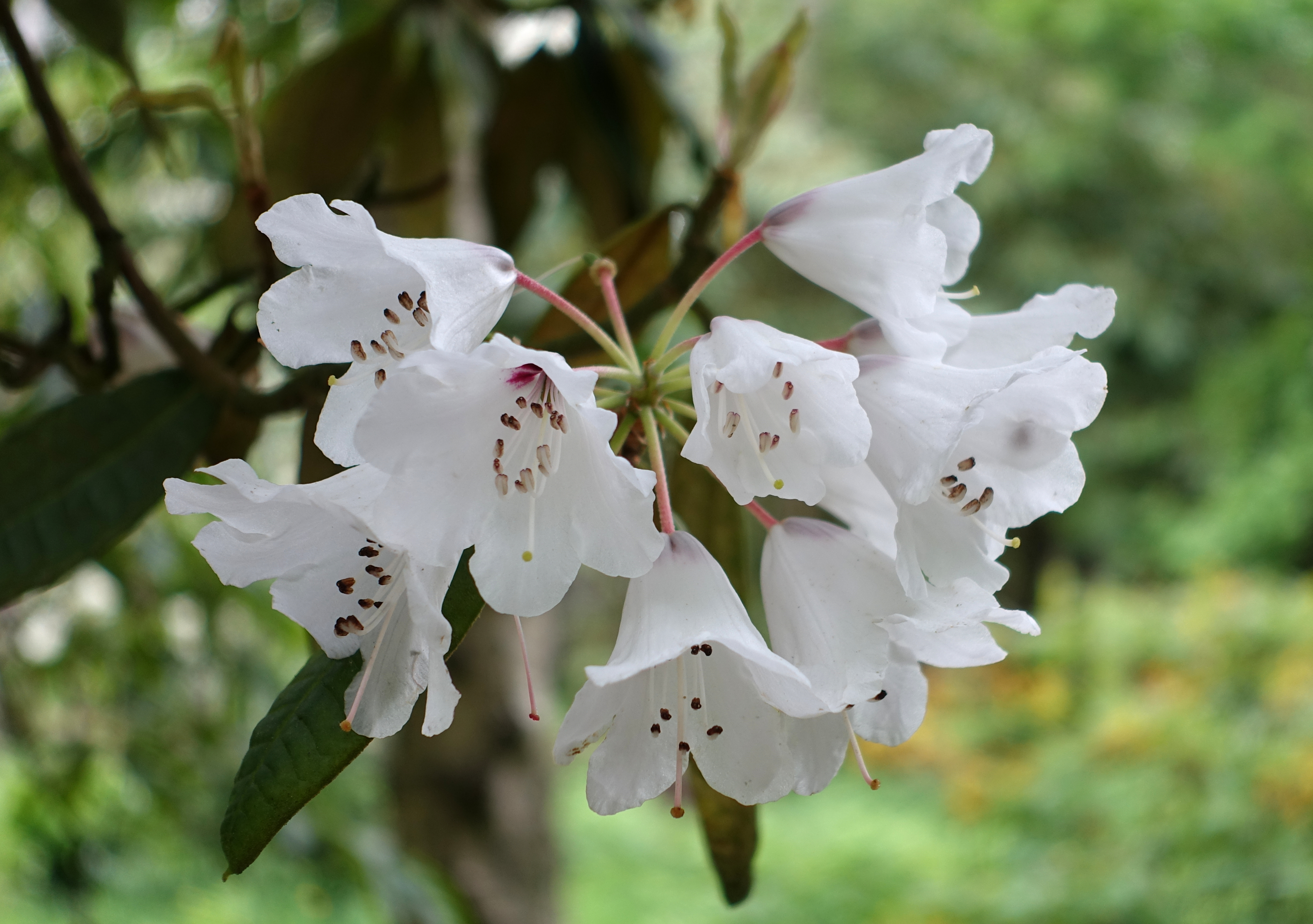
Rhododendron galactinum

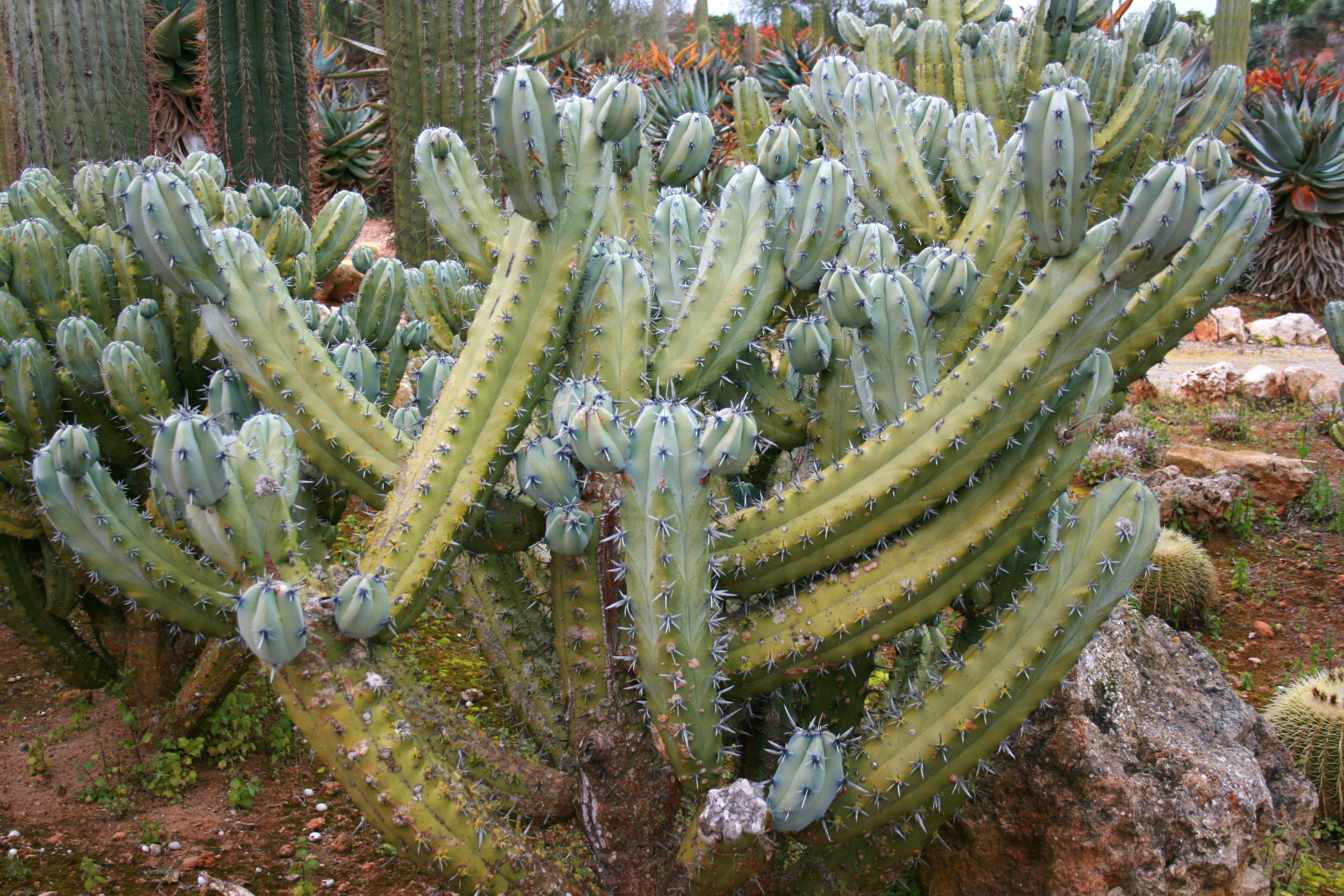
Myrtillocactus geometrizans

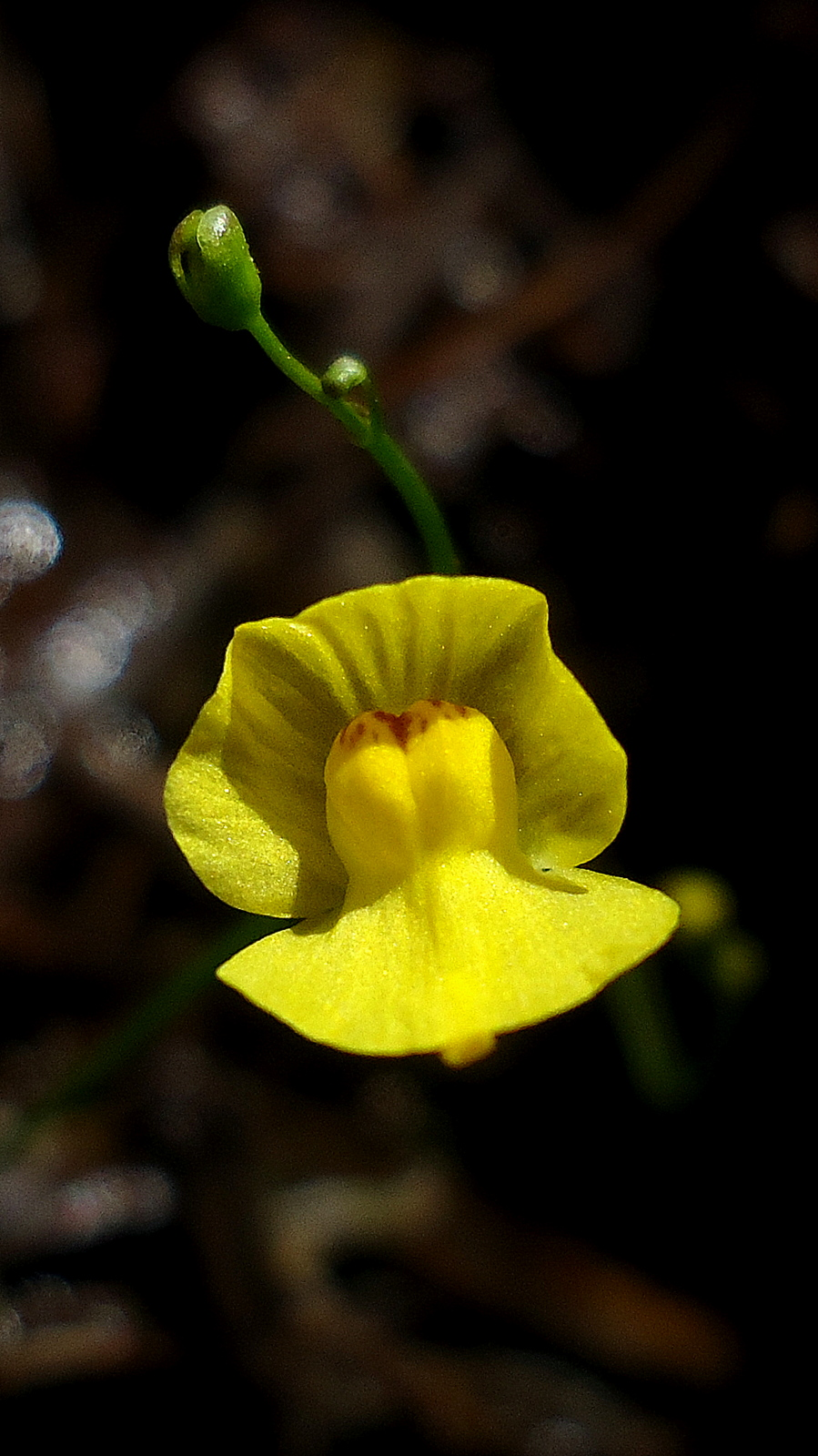
Utricularia gibba

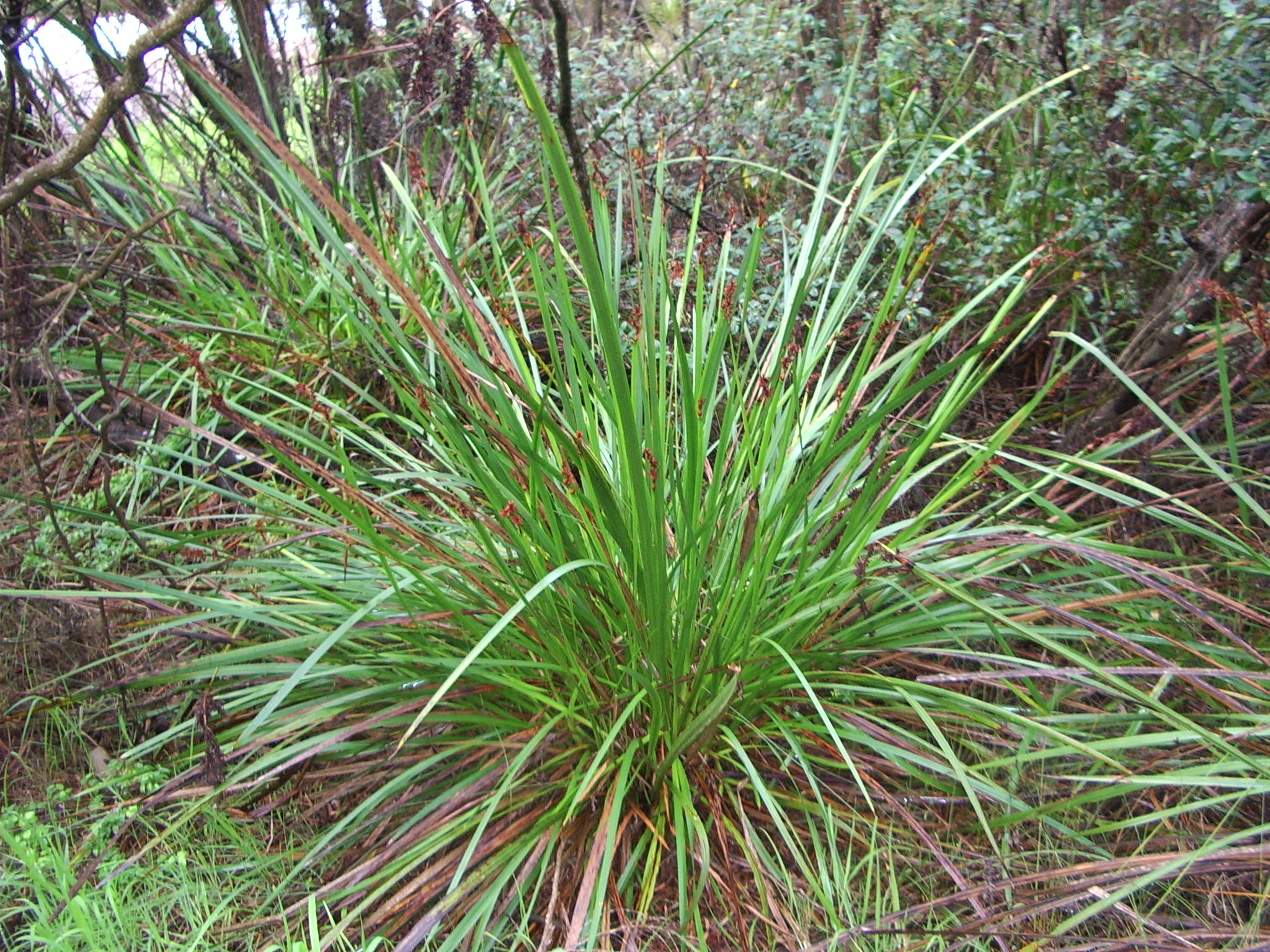
Lepidosperma gladiatum

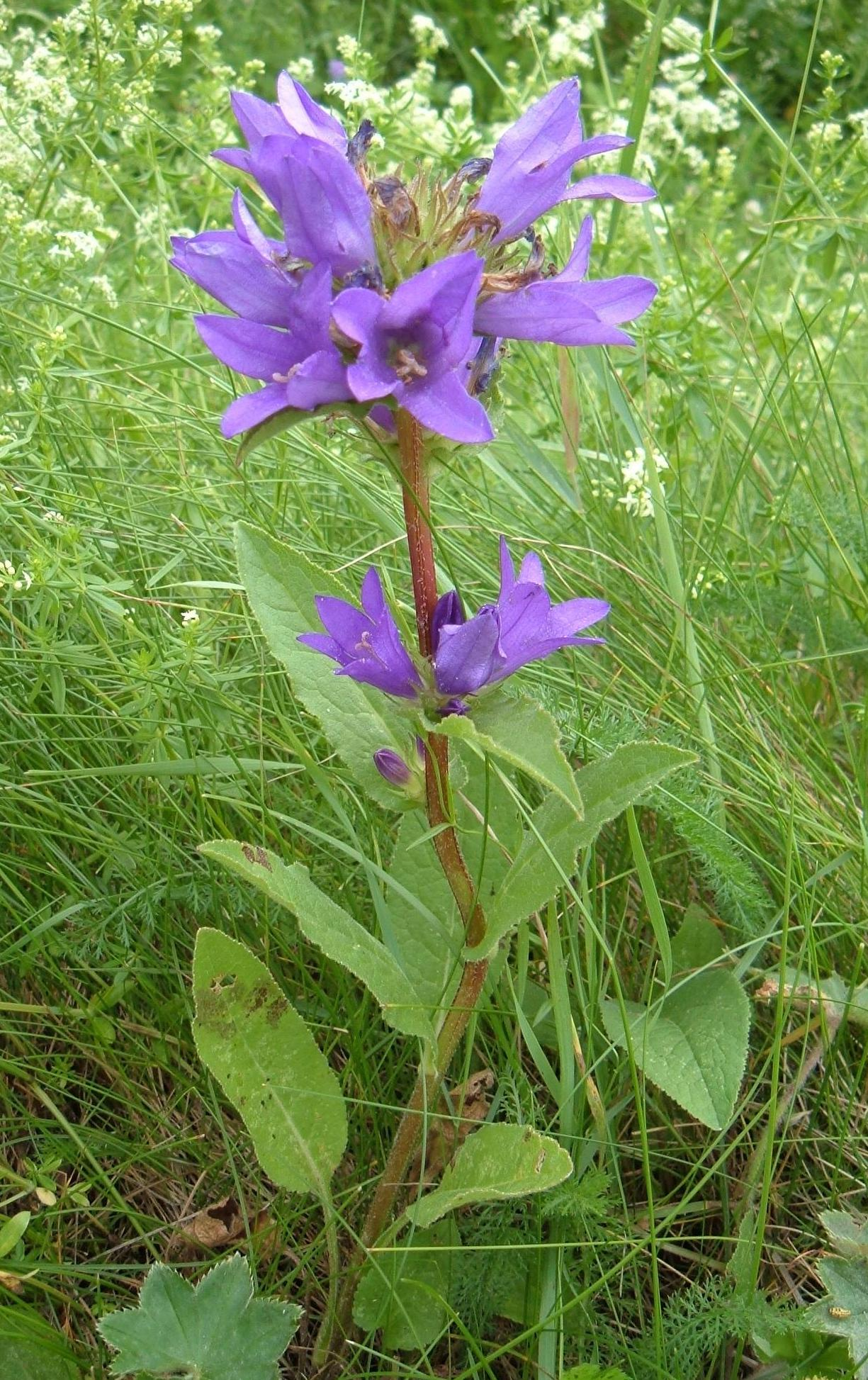
Campanula glomerata

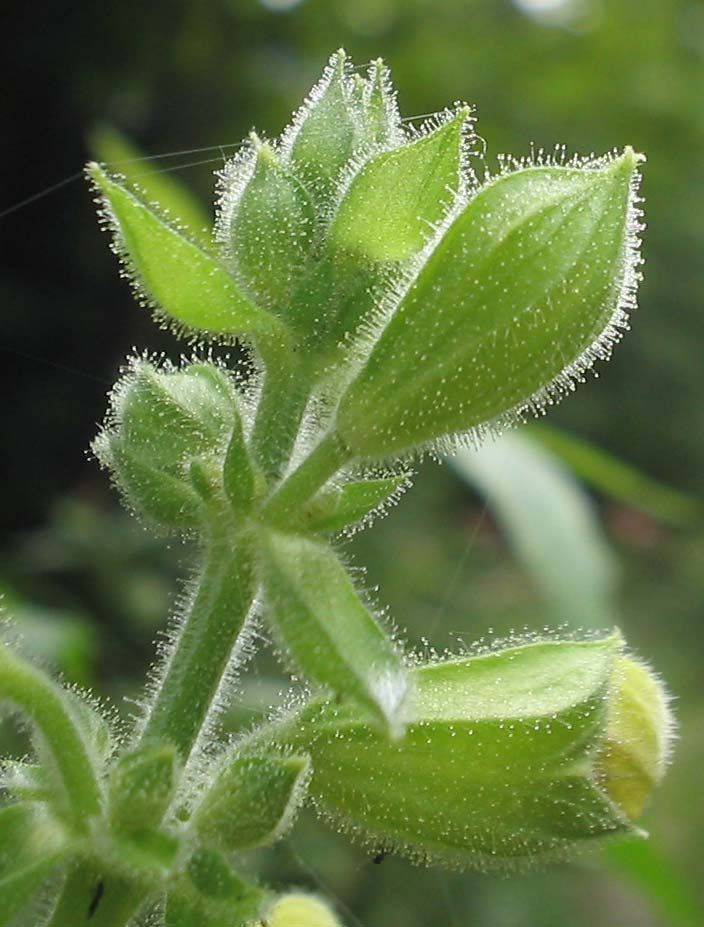
Salvia glutinosa

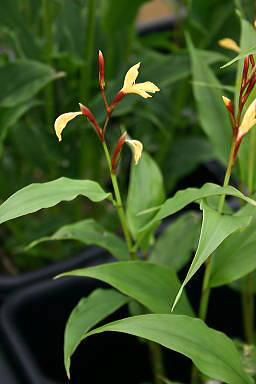
Cautleya gracilis

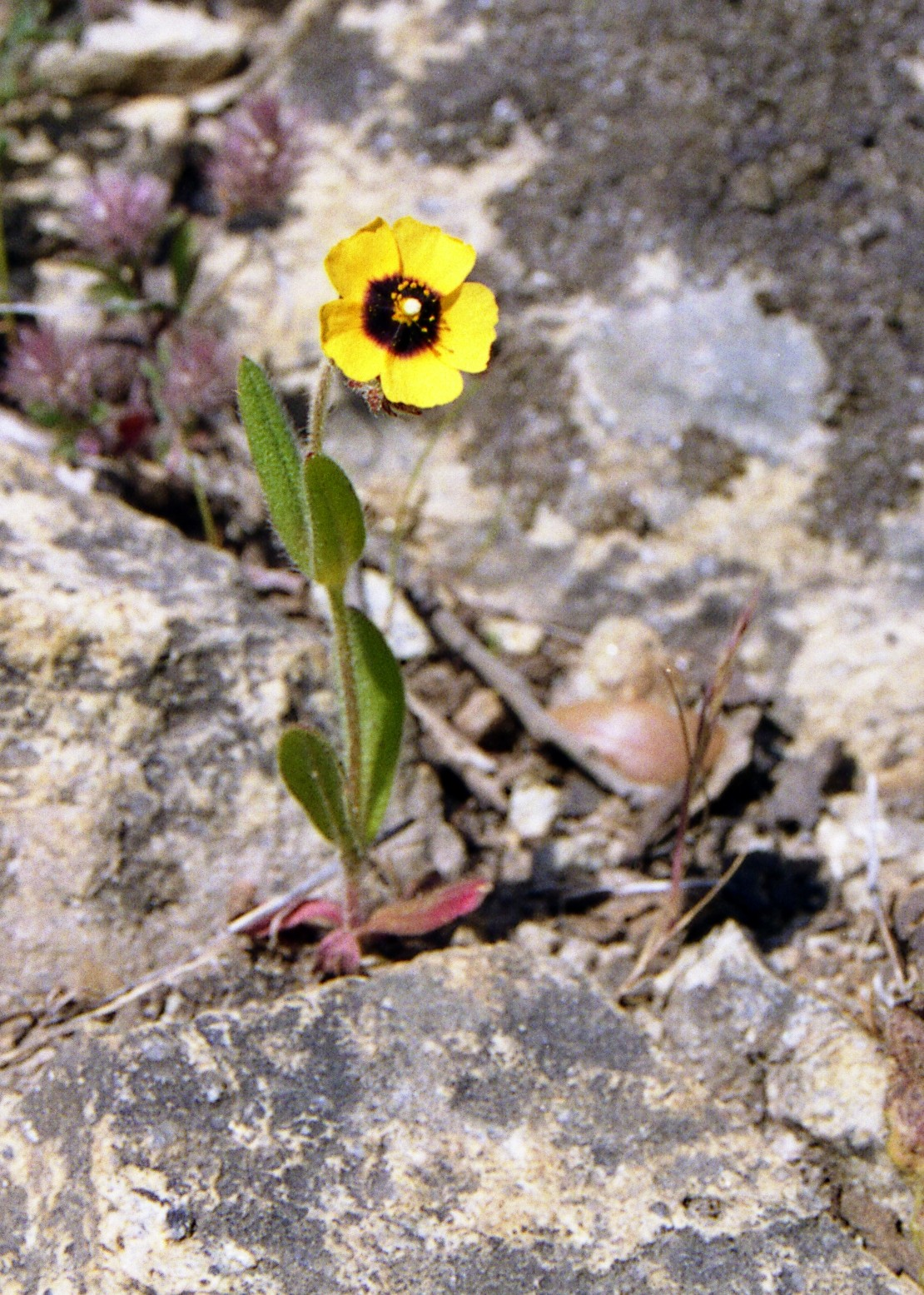
Tuberaria guttata

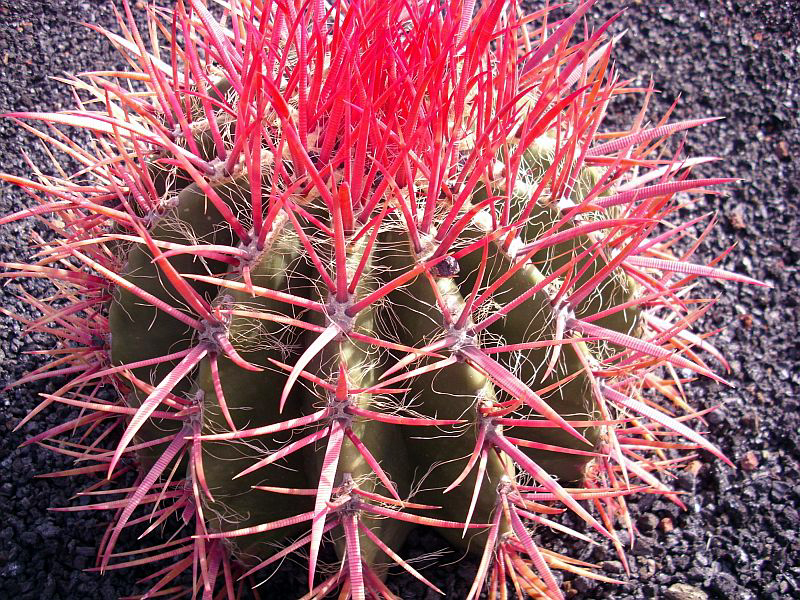
Ferocactus haematacanthus

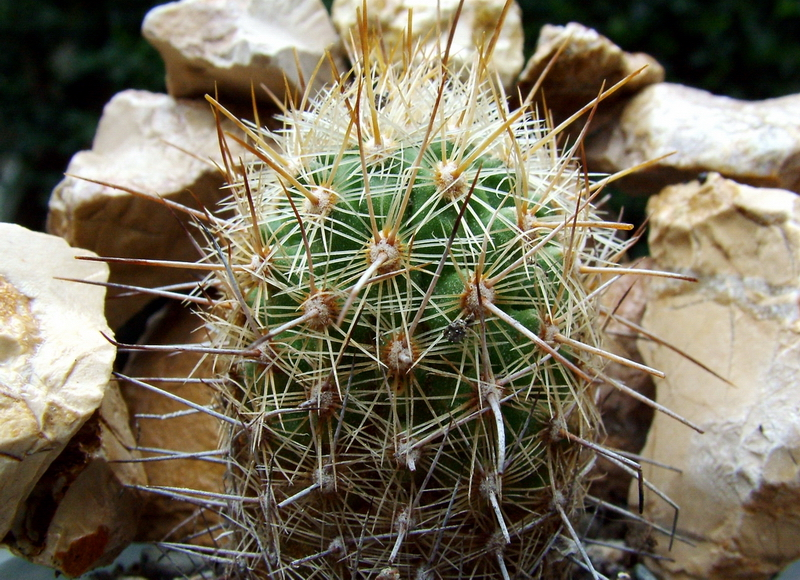
Thelocactus hastifer

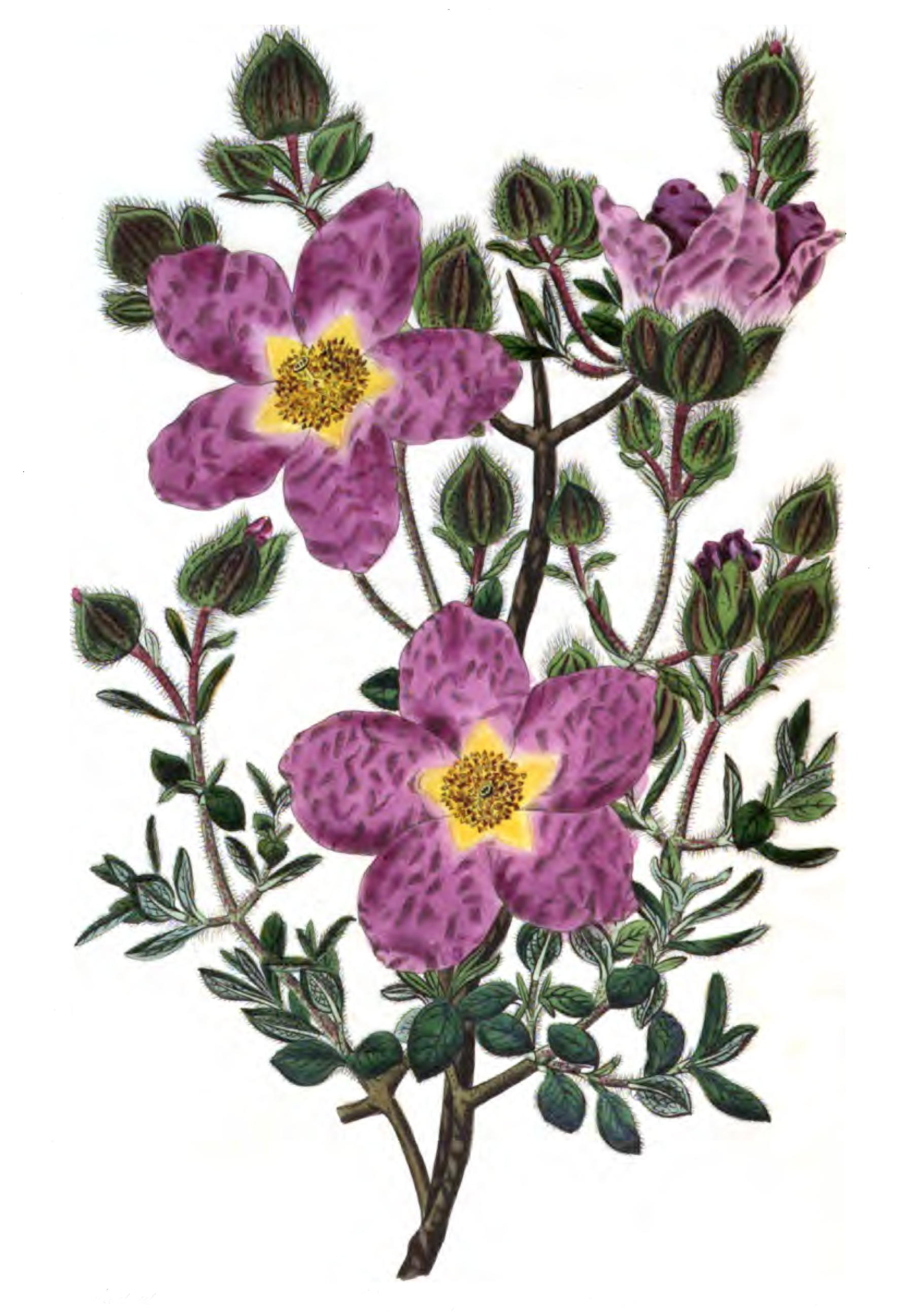
Illustration of Cistus heterophyllus

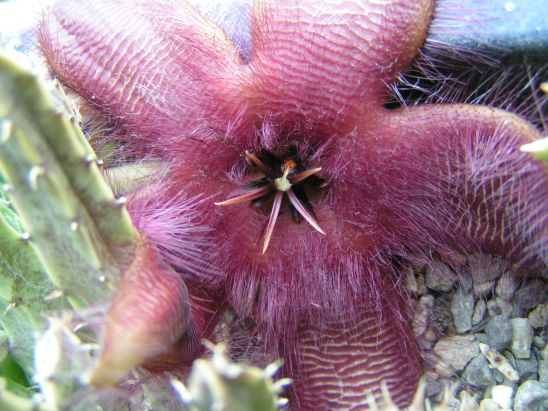
Stapelia hirsuta

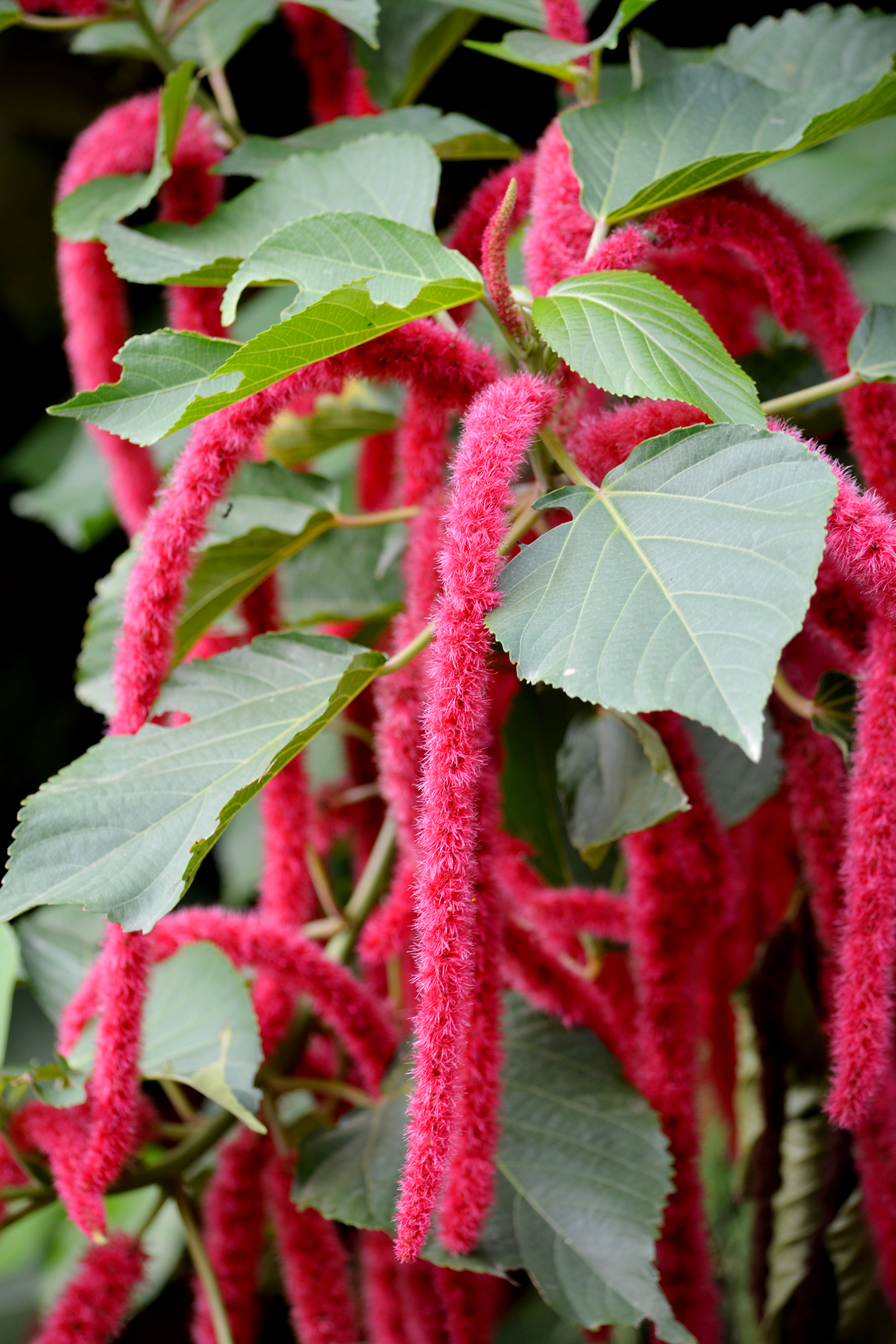
Acalypha hispida

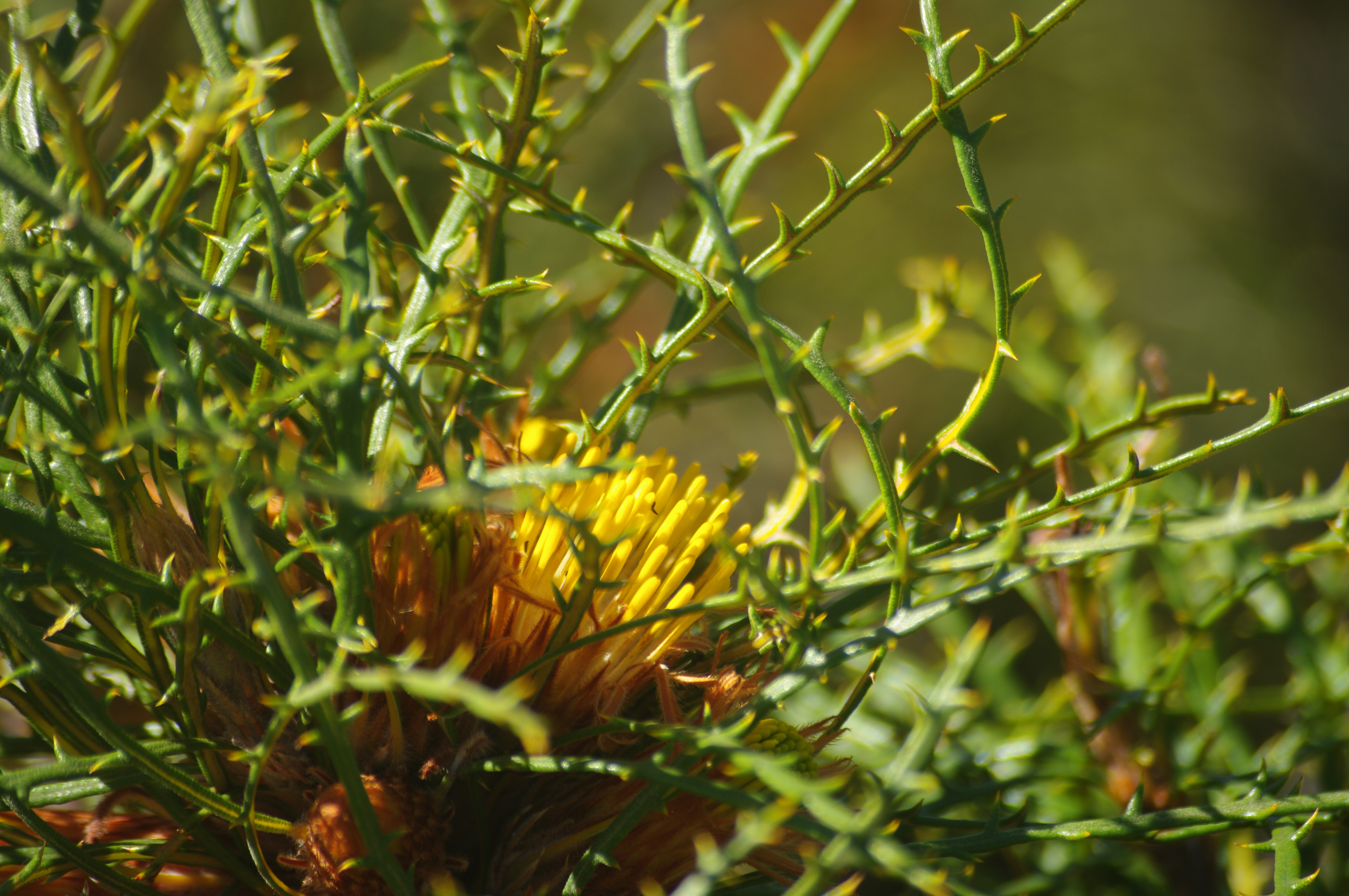
Banksia horrida

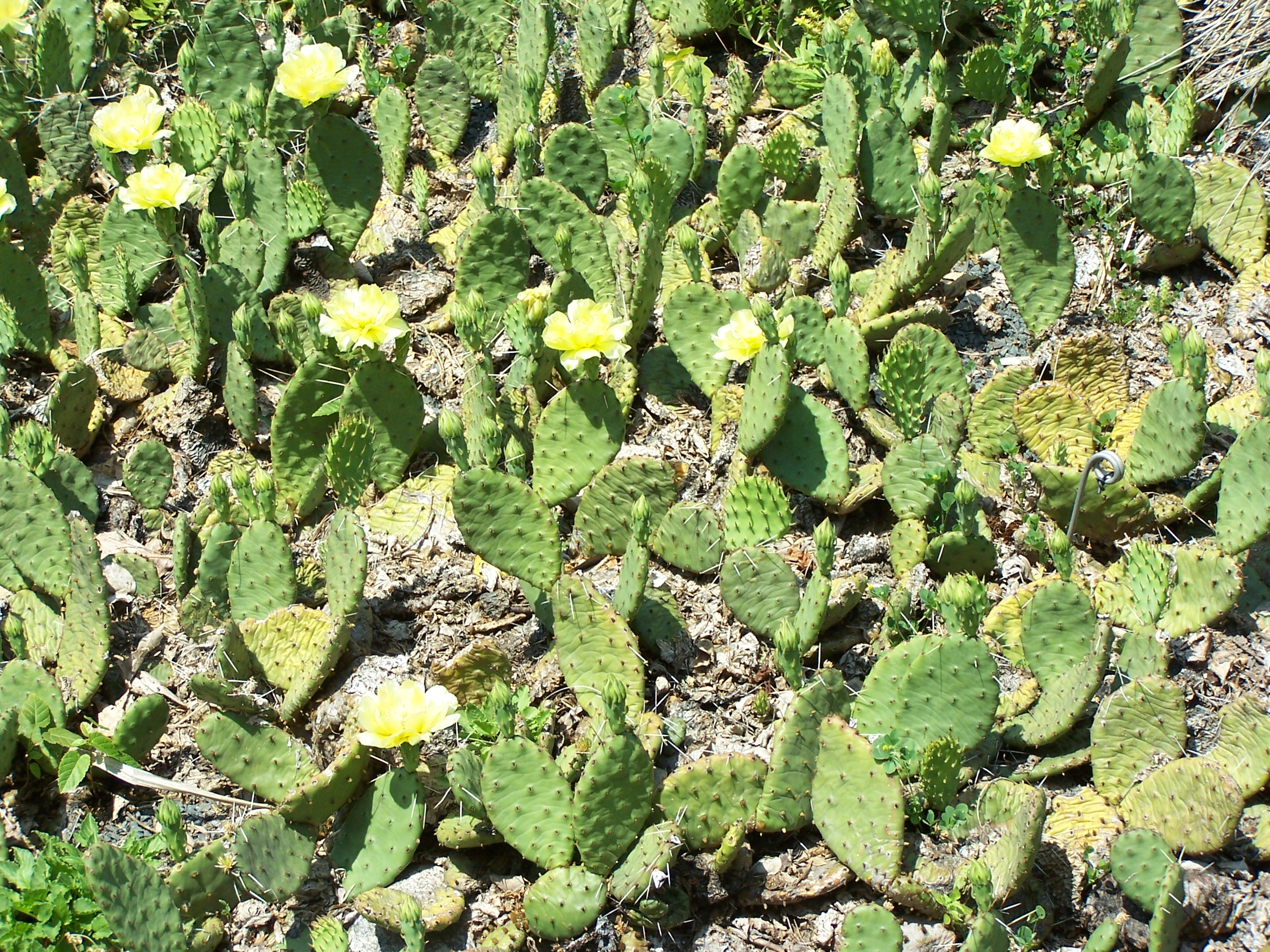
Opuntia humifusa

Epithets
Epithets (Note: Since all of the references cited in the table except Coombes arrange their species epithets alphabetically, citations with page numbers are provided only for Coombes, and each source in the table except for Coombes is always represented by the same superscript.)	LG	Meanings and derivations	Example species (Note: Red links for species are followed by an asterisk linking to the genus.)	H	DS	C
abbreviatus	L	shortened	Caladenia abbreviata	H	DS	
aberrans	L	aberrant, from aberro, to deviate	Acronychia aberrans		DS	
abortivus	L	abortive	Ranunculus abortivus	H	DS	
abruptus	L	cut off	Acacia abrupta		DS	
abscissus	L	cut off, from abscindo	Narcissus abscissus		DS	
abundiflorus	L	flowering abundantly	Alpinia abundiflora*		D	
acaulis	L	(apparently) stemless, from a- + caulis	Silene acaulis	H	DS	C
acephalus	G	headless	Syngonanthus acephalus*		D	
acer	L	sharp-tasting or (per Stearn) sharp to the touch. Bayton lists only the genus Acer.	Pimelea acra*	H	D	
acris	L	sharp-tasting or (per Stearn) sharp to the touch.	Ranunculus acris	H	D	C
acerbus	L	harsh; bitter	Hovenia acerba		DS	
acerosus	L	sharp; needle-shaped	Verticordia acerosa	H	DS	C
acetosus	L	vinegary, from acetum; sour	Rumex acetosa	H	DS	C
acicularis	L	needle-shaped, from acus, needle; acicular	Orites acicularis	H	DS	C
aciculifer	L	needle-shaped, from acus, needle; acicular	Orites acicularis		D	
acidus	L	sour	Phyllanthus acidus		DS	
acidosus	L	sour	Phyllanthus acidus		D	
acidissimus	L	sour	Phyllanthus acidus		D	
acinaceus	L	scimitar	Acacia acinacea	H	D	
aciniformis	L	scimitar	Acacia acinacea		DS	
acraeus	L	high-dwelling	Ranunculus acraeus	H		
aculeatus	L	stinging or sharp; aculeate	Banksia aculeata	H	DS	C
aculeolatus	L	stinging or sharp; aculeate	Banksia aculeata	H	D	
aculeatissimus	L	sharpest	Solanum aculeatissimum		D	
acuminatus	L	tapering; acuminate	Musa acuminata	H	DS	C
acutus	L	pointed; acute	Juncus acutus	H	DS	C
acutangulus	L	pointed; acute	Juncus acutus		DS	
acutissimus	L	most acute	Quercus acutissima	H	D	C
adenophorus	G	gland-bearing	Ageratina adenophora	H	DS	
admirabilis	L	admirable	Drosera admirabilis	H	D	
adnatus	L	joined (organs), from agnascor, to be late-born; adnate	Nepenthes adnata	H	DS	
adpressus	L	pressed close together, from apprimo; appressed. (Also appressus.)	Muehlenbeckia adpressa	H	DS	C
adscendens	L	ascending, from ascendo	Melicope adscendens	H	DS	
adscitus	L	adopted	Rubus adscitus*		D	
adsurgens	L	rising, from adsurgo	Acacia adsurgens	H	D	
aduncus	L	hooked	Piper aduncum	H	DS	
adustus	L	sunburnt; brown	Carex adusta		DS	
advenus	L	stranger, from advena	Nuphar advena		DS	
aemulus	L	emulating. (Also aemulans.)	Banksia aemula	H	DS	
aeneus	L	bronze	Begonia aenea*		DS	
aequalis	L	equal	Diuris aequalis	H	DS	C
aequinoctialis	L	equatorial, from aequinoctium, equinox	Aneilema aequinoctiale	H	D	
aerius	L	aerial	Crocus aerius	H	DS	
aeruginosus	L	verdigris, from aerugo	Pimelea aeruginosa		DS	
aestivus	L	summer	Leucojum aestivum		DS	C
aestivalis	L	summer	Leucojum aestivum		DS	C
affinis	L	related, from adfinis, adjoining	Stachys affinis		DS	C
aganniphus	G	snow-covered. Stearn's spelling is agannifus.	Rhododendron aganniphum		D	
agastus	G	charming	Rhododendron agastum*	H	D	
agglutinatus	L	glued, from agglutino, to stick on	Echites agglutinatus*		DS	
aggregatus	L	clustered, from aggrego, to bring together	Eucalyptus aggregata	H	DS	C
agrarius	L	of the land	Fumaria agraria	H	DS	
agrestis	L	uncultivated; growing in fields	Rosa agrestis	H	DS	
agrifolius	L	rough-leaved	Quercus agrifolia	H	D	
alatus	L	winged; alate	Mimulus alatus	H	DS	C
albus	L	white	Melilotus albus	H	DS	C
albidus	L	off-white. (Also albulus.)	Sassafras albidum, Echium albicans	H	DS	C
albescens	L	off-white. (Also albulus.)	Sassafras albidum, Echium albicans	H	DS	
albicans	L	off-white. (Also albulus.)	Sassafras albidum, Echium albicans	H	D	C
algidus	L	cold	Boronia algida		DS	
alienus	L	alien; introduced	Quercus aliena		DS	
alpestris	L	of mountains	Prasophyllum alpestre	H	D	C
alpinus	L	alpine; of mountains	Potamogeton alpinus	H	DS	C
alpicola	L	alpine; of mountains	Potamogeton alpinus	H	D	C
alpigenus	L	alpine; of mountains	Potamogeton alpinus	H	D	
alternus	L	alternating; alternate	Physocarpus alternans		DS	
alternans	L	alternating; alternate	Physocarpus alternans	H	DS	
altus	L	tall; high	Coccothrinax alta	H	DS	
altissimus	L	tallest; highest	Ailanthus altissima	H	D	C
alticola	L	growing in high places	Genoplesium alticola		D	
alulatus	L	narrow-winged	Boronia alulata		D	
alutaceus	L	leathery, from aluta, soft leather	Shorea alutacea		DS	
amabilis	L	lovely. Previously ama-bilis (Stearn).	Phalaenopsis amabilis	H	DS	C
amarus	L	bitter	Simarouba amara	H	DS	
amarellus	L	bitter	Simarouba amara	H	D	
ambiguus	L	ambiguous	Kunzea ambigua	H	DS	
amblyanthus	G	blunt-flowered	Bulbophyllum amblyanthum	H	S	
ambrosiacus	L	ambrosia	Achillea ambrosiaca*		D	
amethystinus	L	violet; purple	Primula amethystina	H	DS	C
ammophilus	G	sand-loving	Eucalyptus ammophila	H	DS	
amoenus	L	pleasant	Felicia amoena	H	DS	C
amphibius	G	growing both on land and in water	Persicaria amphibia	H	DS	
amplexicaulis	L	stem-embracing, from amplexor, to embrace; amplexicaul	Hakea amplexicaulis	H	DS	C
amplus	L	ample; large	Callicarpa ampla	H	DS	
amplissimus	L	most ample	Ficus amplissima		D	
ampliatus	L	enlarged, from amplio	Acacia ampliata		DS	
ampullaceus	L	flask-shaped, from ampulla	Senecio ampullaceus		DS	
amygdalinus	L	almond, from amygdalum	Eucalyptus amygdalina	H	DS	
amygdaliformis	L	almond, from amygdalum	Eucalyptus amygdalina	H	D	
amygdaloides	L	almond, from amygdalum	Eucalyptus amygdalina	H	D	C
anacanthus	G	thornless; spineless	Opuntia anacantha		DS	
anceps	L	two-headed; two-sided; uncertain	Epidendrum anceps	H	DS	C
androgynus	L	androgyne; androgynous	Sauropus androgynus	H	DS	
anfractuosus	L	recurving, from anfractus	Acacia anfractuosa		DS	
anguinus	L	serpentine	Smilax anguina*		D	
angulatus	L	angular	Cycas angulata	H	DS	
angularis	L	angular	Cycas angulata	H	DS	
angulosus	L	angular	Cycas angulata	H	DS	
anguliger	L	hooked	Disocactus anguliger		D	
angustatus	L	narrowed	Protea angustata		DS	
anisophyllus	G	with unequal leaves	Artocarpus anisophyllus	H	DS	
annularis	L	ring-shaped; with an annulus	Eucalyptus annulata		DS	
annulatus	L	ring-shaped; with an annulus	Eucalyptus annulata	H	DS	
annuus	L	lasting a year	Helianthus annuus	H	DS	C
anomalus	G	anomalous	Hydrangea anomala	H	DS	C
anosmus	G	odorless	Dendrobium anosmum	H	D	
anserinus	L	of a goose, anser	Argentina anserina		DS	
anthelmius	L	anti-worm	Spigelia anthelmia		D	
anthopogon	G	bearded flowers	Rhododendron anthopogon		D	
antiquorum	L	ancient (Note: The -um ending here denotes a genitive plural noun.)	Euphorbia antiquorum	H	D	
antiquus	L	ancient	Euphorbia antiquorum	H	DS	
apertus	L	uncovered; open	Caladenia aperta	H	DS	
apetalus	G	without petals	Pomaderris apetala	H	DS	
aphyllus	G	leafless	Euphorbia aphylla	H	DS	
apiatus	L	bee-like, from apis	Gentiana apiata*		D	
apiculatus	L	pointed, from apicula, a small bee; apiculate	Darwinia apiculata	H	D	C
apifer	L	(apparently) bearing a bee, from apis (Note: Harrison and Bayton list an -erus ending for many -fer and -ger epithets; Stearn occasionally gives an -ers ending.)	Ophrys apifera	H	D	
apodus	L	footless; stalkless	Bulbophyllum apodum	H	DS	
appendiculatus	L	with appendages, from appendicula	Salix appendiculata	H	DS	
applanatus	L	flattened	Acacia applanata	H	DS	
appressus	L	pressed close together, from apprimo; appressed. (Also adpressus.)	Eremophila appressa	H	DS	
apricus	L	sun-exposed; sun-loving	Eriogonum apricum	H	DS	
apterus	G	wingless	Zizia aptera	H	D	
apus	G	stalkless. Feminine and neuter apus.	Gigantochloa apus*		D	
aquaticus	L	in water; aquatic	Ipomoea aquatica	H	DS	C
aquatilis	L	in water; aquatic	Ipomoea aquatica	H	DS	
aquilinus	L	eagle-like, from aquila	Eucalyptus aquilina	H	D	
arachnoides	G	spider; cobwebbed; arachnoid	Anacampseros arachnoides	H	D	
arachnoideus	G	spider; cobwebbed; arachnoid	Anacampseros arachnoides	H	DS	C
araiophyllus	G	slender-leaved	Bulbophyllum araiophyllum*		D	
araneosus	L	spider-webbed	Acacia araneosa		DS	
arboreus	L	tree-like; arborescent	Ceanothus arboreus	H	DS	C
arborescens	L	tree-like; arborescent	Ceanothus arboreus	H	DS	C
arboricola	L	tree-dwelling	Lilium arboricola	H	S	
arbusculus	L	shrubby. Diminutive of arbor. (Note: The suffix -ulus and other diminutives can mean, among other things, "little" or "a little"; the exact meanings are beyond the scope of this list.)	Euphorbia arbuscula	H	DS	
arcticus	G	far northern	Salix arctica	H	DS	
arcuatus	L	bowed	Calothamnus arcuatus	H	DS	
ardens	L	glowing	Urtica ardens*		D	
arenarius	L	sand-dwelling	Ammophila arenaria	H	DS	C
arenicola	L	sand-dwelling	Ammophila arenaria	H	D	
arenosus	L	sandy; gritty	Arabidopsis arenosa	H	DS	
areolatus	L	areolate; having areoles	Pterostylis areolata	H	DS	
argentatus	L	silvery	Coccothrinax argentata	H	D	C
argenteus	L	silvery	Coccothrinax argentata	H	DS	C
argillaceus	L	white-clay	Phacelia argillacea		DS	
argophyllus	L	silvery-leaved	Eriogonum argophyllum	H	DS	
argutus	L	notched	Rubus argutus	H	DS	C
argyraeus	L	silvery. (Also argyreus.)	Acacia argyraea	H	DS	C
aridus	L	dry	Acacia arida	H	DS	
arietinus	L	like a ram, from aries	Cicer arietinum	H	D	
aristatus	L	awned; aristate	Pinus aristata	H	DS	C
aristosus	L	awned; aristate	Pinus aristata		D	
arizelus	G	conspicuous	Lupinus arizelus*		D	
armatus	L	armed (with spines or thorns)	Banksia armata	H	DS	
armiger	L	armed (with spines or thorns)	Banksia armata		DS	
armillatus	L	with bracelets or collars	Eucalyptus armillata		D	
armillaris	L	with bracelets or collars	Eucalyptus armillata	H	D	
aromaticus	G	aromatic	Syzygium aromaticum		DS	C
arrectus	L	erect, from adrectus	Genoplesium arrectum		DS	
articulatus	L	jointed, from artus; articulate	Juncus articulatus	H	DS	C
arundinaceus	L	reedy, from arundo	Phalaris arundinacea	H	D	
arvensis	L	of plowed fields, from arvum, ploughed land	Cirsium arvense	H	DS	C
ascendens	L	ascendant, from ascensus; ascending	Taxodium ascendens	H	DS	
asper	L	rough	Corymbia aspera	H	DS	C
asperatus	L	rough	Corymbia aspera	H	DS	
asperrimus	L	roughest	Bartsia asperrima*	H	D	
assimilis	L	resembling	Sauropus assimilis	H	D	
assurgens	L	ascending	Leptocereus assurgens*		DS	
ater	L	dead-black; dark. Feminine atra, neuter atrum.	Neololeba atra		DS	
atratus	L	blackened	Microtis atrata		DS	C
attenuatus	L	tapering	Banksia attenuata	H	DS	C
aucuparius	L	bird-catching, from aucupium	Sorbus aucuparia	H		
augustus	L	majestic	Rhopaloblaste augusta	H	D	
aurantiacus	L	orangish	Banksia aurantia	H	DS	C
aurantius	L	orangish	Banksia aurantia	H	D	
aureus	L	golden	Ficus aurea	H	DS	C
auratus	L	golden	Ficus aurea	H	DS	
auriculatus	L	eared, from auricula; with auricles. (Also auriculus.)	Roscoea auriculata	H	DS	C
auritus	L	eared, from auricula; with auricles. (Also auriculus.)	Roscoea auriculata	H	DS	
australis	L	southern	Cordyline australis	H	DS	C
austrinus	L	southern	Cordyline australis	H	D	
autumnalis	L	of autumn	Mandragora autumnalis		DS	C
avicularis	L	of small birds, from avis	Polygonum aviculare		D	
avium	L	of birds, from avis	Prunus avium	H	D	C
axillaris	L	axillary	Pseudowintera axillaris	H	DS	C
azureus	L	sky-blue	Salvia azurea	H	DS	C
baccatus	L	berry, from baca	Taxus baccata		DS	C
baccans	L	berry, from baca	Taxus baccata		DS	
baccifer	L	berry, from baca	Taxus baccata		DS	
bacillaris	L	rod-like, from bacillum	Senna bacillaris*	H	DS	
badius	L	nut brown	Symplocos badia	H	S	
barbarus	L	foreign	Lycium barbarum	H	D	C
barbatus	L	bearded	Dianthus barbatus	H	DS	C
barbiger	L	bearded	Dianthus barbatus	H	D	
barbatulus	L	bearded	Dianthus barbatus	H	D	
barbulatus	L	bearded	Dianthus barbatus	H	D	
barystachys	G	heavy-spiked	Lysimachia barystachys		DS	
basilaris	L	basal	Opuntia basilaris	H	DS	
basilicus	G	royal	Ocimum basilicum	H	D	C
bellus	L	beautiful	Corymbia bella	H	D	C
benedictus	L	blessed	Cnicus benedictus	H	D	
bicolor	L	two-colored	Erythranthe bicolor	H	DS	C
bicornis	L	two-horned	Aiphanes bicornis	H	DS	
bicornutus	L	two-horned	Aiphanes bicornis	H	D	
bidentatus	L	two-toothed	Manilkara bidentata		DS	
biennis	L	biennial	Oenothera biennis	H	DS	C
bifidus	L	divided in two	Trifolium bifidum	H	D	
biflorus	L	two-flowered	Darwinia biflora	H	DS	C
bifurcatus	L	two-forked	Amyema bifurcata	H	DS	
bijugus	L	double-yoked	Intsia bijuga	H	DS	
binervatus	L	two-veined	Carex binervis		D	
binervis	L	two-veined	Carex binervis		DS	
binervosus	L	two-veined	Carex binervis		D	
bipinnatus	L	bipinnate	Sanicula bipinnata	H	DS	C
bisectus	L	bisected, from sectus	Zingiber bisectum*		D	
biserratus	L	doubly serrated, from serratus	Eremophila biserrata	H	DS	
biternatus	L	twice-ternate; biternate	Enemion biternatum	H	DS	
bituminosus	L	tarry, from bitumen	Moraea bituminosa	H	D	
bivalvis	L	bivalved, from valvae; with two valves	Peristrophe bivalvis	H	DS	
blandus	L	flattering; alluring	Anemonoides blanda		D	C
blepharocalyx	G	fringed-calyx	Alpinia blepharocalyx*		DS	
bombycinus	L	silky	Cymbopogon bombycinus		DS	
borealis	L	northern, from boreas	Banksia borealis	H	DS	
botryoides	G	clustered, like grapes	Eucalyptus botryoides	H	D	C
brachiatus	L	with arm-like branches, from brachium	Buddleja brachiata	H	DS	
brachyanthus	G	short-flowered	Oryza brachyantha		D	
bracteatus	L	with bracts	Xerochrysum bracteatum	H	DS	C
brevis	L	short	Conophytum breve	H	DS	
bronchialis	G	of or for the lungs	Saxifraga bronchialis	H	D	
brumalis	L	wintry	Diuris brumalis		DS	
brunneus	L	brown	Banksia brunnea	H	DS	C
bryoides	G	mossy	Saxifraga bryoides	H	D	
buccinatus	L	trumpet-shaped, from buccina	Hemigenia buccinata*		D	
buccinatorius	L	trumpet-shaped, from buccina	Hemigenia buccinata*		D	
bulbifer	G	bulb	Cicuta bulbifera	H	DS	C
bulbiformis	G	bulb	Cicuta bulbifera		DS	
bulbosus	G	bulb	Cicuta bulbifera	H	DS	
bullatus	L	with bubbles, from bulla; bullate	Annona bullata	H	DS	C
cadmicus	L	metallic	Salvia cadmica*	H	D	
caerulescens	L	becoming blue	Thlaspi caerulescens	H	DS	
caeruleus	L	azure	Lonicera caerulea	H	DS	C
caesius	L	bluish-gray; lavender blue; cutting	Eucalyptus caesia	H	DS	C
caespitosus	L	caespitose, from caespes, turf. (Also caespititius.)	Pilosella caespitosa	H	DS	
calcaratus	L	spurred, from calcar; calcarate	Stylidium calcaratum	H	DS	
calcareus	L	lime; calcareous	Mitrephora calcarea	H	DS	C
calcicola	L	lime; calcareous	Mitrephora calcarea		D	
calceolus	L	shoe	Cypripedium calceolus		D	C
callistus	G	very beautiful	Eriogonum callistum		D	
callosus	L	callous or hard-skinned; callose	Strobilanthes callosa	H	DS	
calophyllus	G	with beautiful leaves	Gonystylus calophyllus	H	DS	
calvus	L	bald	Gunniopsis calva	H	DS	
calycinus	G	like a calyx; with a prominent calyx	Hypericum calycinum	H	DS	C
calyptratus	G	with a calyptra, a cap-like cover	Calandrinia calyptrata	H	DS	
campanularius	L	bell; campanulate	Phacelia campanularia	H	D	C
campanulatus	L	bell; campanulate	Phacelia campanularia	H	DS	C
campestris	L	even; flat; of plains. From campester.	Acer campestre	H	DS	C
campylocarpus	L	curved-fruit	Isatis campylocarpa*	H	D	
canaliculatus	L	grooved, from canalis; canaliculate	Protea canaliculata	H	DS	
cancellatus	L	latticed, from cancelli	Ceropegia cancellata*	H	DS	
candelabrum	L	candelabrum	Euphorbia candelabrum	H	D	C
candidus	L	shining white	Cypripedium candidum	H	DS	C
candicans	L	shining white	Cypripedium candidum	H	DS	C
candidissimus	L	whitest, from candor	Arisaema candidissimum		D	C
canus	L	grey- or white-haired; canescent	Artemisia cana	H	DS	C
canescens	L	grey- or white-haired; canescent	Artemisia cana	H	DS	C
caninus	L	canine	Rosa canina	H	DS	
caperatus	L	wrinkled. Possibly, goat.	Anthurium caperatum*		DS	C
capillaceus	L	hair-like, from capillus	Carex capillacea		DS	
capillaris	L	hair-like, from capillus	Carex capillacea	H	DS	
capilliformis	L	hair-like, from capillus	Carex capillacea	H	DS	
capillatus	L	hairy; with fine hairs	Caladenia capillata	H	D	
capitatus	L	having dense-headed growth; capitate	Roscoea capitata	H	DS	C
capitellatus	L	small-headed, from capitulum	Mimetes capitulatus	H	D	
capitellus	L	small-headed, from capitulum	Mimetes capitulatus	H	D	
capitulatus	L	small-headed, from capitulum	Mimetes capitulatus	H	D	
capreolatus	L	with tendrils; supported. From capreolus, props or stays.	Bignonia capreolata	H	D	C
capreus	L	goat	Salix caprea	H	D	C
capsularis	L	capsule-producing, from capsula	Corchorus capsularis	H	DS	
cardinalis	L	scarlet	Lobelia cardinalis	H	DS	C
carinatus	L	keeled, from carina; having a keel	Zephyranthes carinata	H	DS	C
carmineus	L	carmine. From Arabic and Latin.	Metrosideros carminea	H	DS	
carnosus	L	fleshy, from carnis; carnose	Hoya carnosa	H	DS	C
carneus	L	fleshy, from carnis; carnose	Hoya carnosa	H	DS	C
carnosulus	L	fleshy, from carnis; carnose	Hoya carnosa	H	DS	
cartilagineus	L	cartilage-like; cartilaginous	Oceaniopteris cartilaginea	H	DS	
castus	L	pure	Mimosa casta*		D	
catacosmus	G	adorned	Rhododendron catacosmum*		D	
cataria	L	of cats	Nepeta cataria	H	D	C
catarractae	G	of waterfalls	Veronica catarractae	H	DS	C
catharticus	G	cathartic	Rhamnus cathartica	H	D	C
caudatus	L	tailed, from cauda; caudate	Entandrophragma caudatum	H	DS	C
caulescens	L	stemmed, from caulis; caulescent	Mandragora caulescens	H	D	C
causticus	G	caustic	Lithraea caustica	H	D	
cauticola	L	cliff-dwelling, from cautes	Sedum cauticola	H	D	C
cavus	L	hollow	Corydalis cava	H	DS	C
centifolius	L	many-leaved, from centum, one hundred	Berberis centifolia*	H	DS	
centralis	L	central	Rubus centralis	H	DS	
cephalotes	G	small-headed	Leucas cephalotes	H	D	
ceraceus	L	waxy, from cera; ceraceous	Eucalyptus ceracea	H	DS	
cerasifer	L	cherry, from cerasus	Eucalyptus cerasiformis	H	D	
cerasiformis	L	cherry, from cerasus	Eucalyptus cerasiformis	H	D	
cerasinus	L	cherry-red	Corybas cerasinus	H	DS	
cerealis	L	agricultural	Secale cereale	H	D	
cereus	L	waxy	Ribes cereum	H	DS	C
cerifer	L	waxy	Ribes cereum	H	D	C
cerinus	L	waxy	Ribes cereum	H	DS	
cernuus	L	nodding; cernuous	Allium cernuum	H	DS	C
charianthus	G	elegantly flowered	Ceratostema charianthum*	H	D	
chasmanthus	G	gape-flowered	Aconitum chasmanthum*		D	
cheiri	G	hand, possibly	Bulbophyllum cheiri	H		
chimaera	L	monstrous; chimeric	Bulbophyllum chimaera		DS	
chloodes	G	grass-green	Centaurium chloodes*		DS	
chloracanthus	L	green-spined	Haworthia chloracantha		DS	
chryseus	G	golden	Nephelium chryseum	H	DS	
ciliaris	L	fringed	Cenchrus ciliaris	H	D	
ciliatus	L	fringed	Cenchrus ciliaris	H	DS	C
ciliosus	L	fringed	Cenchrus ciliaris	H	D	C
cinctus	L	with a girdle; girding	Dacrycarpus cinctus	H	DS	
cinereus	L	ash-gray, from cinis, ashes	Juglans cinerea	H	DS	C
cinerascens	L	ash-gray, from cinis, ashes	Juglans cinerea	H	DS	
cinnabarinus	G	cinnabar-red	Scadoxus cinnabarinus	H	DS	C
circinalis	L	curled, from circino, to round; circinate	Cycas circinalis	H	DS	C
circinatus	L	curled, from circino, to round; circinate	Cycas circinalis		DS	C
cirratus	G	with tendrils; cirrhose. (Also cirrhatus, cirrosus.)	Fritillaria cirrhosa	H	DS	
cirrhosus	G	with tendrils; cirrhose. (Also cirrhatus, cirrosus.)	Fritillaria cirrhosa	H	DS	C
clandestinus	L	concealed	Pennisetum clandestinum	H	DS	
clausus	L	closed; reserved	Pinus clausa	H	DS	
clavatus	L	club, from clava	Lycopodium clavatum	H	DS	
clavellatus	L	club, from clava	Lycopodium clavatum		D	
clivorum	L	of the hills, from clivus	Hymenocallis clivorum		DS	
clypeatus	L	shield-shaped, from clipeus	Nepenthes clipeata	H	DS	
clypeolatus	L	shield-shaped, from clipeus	Nepenthes clipeata	H	D	
coarctatus	L	crowded; pressed together. From coarto.	Haworthiopsis coarctata	H	DS	
coccifer	L	bearing berries	Eucalyptus coccifera	H	D	C
coccineus	L	scarlet, from coccum	Banksia coccinea	H	DS	C
cochlearis	L	spoon-shaped	Acacia cochlearis	H	DS	
cochleatus	L	twisted like a snail shell, from cochlea, snail	Prosthechea cochleata	H	DS	
coelestinus	L	sky-blue, celestial	Conoclinium coelestinum	H	D	C
coelestis	L	sky-blue, celestial	Conoclinium coelestinum	H	DS	
coelicus	L	heavenly, from caelum	Rhododendron coelicum*		D	
coeruleus	L	blue	Aquilegia coerulea	H	DS	C
coerulescens	L	becoming blue	Boronia coerulescens		DS	
cognatus	L	related	Acacia cognata	H	DS	
collinus	L	of the hills, from collis	Erysimum collinum	H	DS	
coloratus	L	coloured	Potamogeton coloratus	H	DS	C
colubrinus	L	snaky, from coluber	Anadenanthera colubrina	H	DS	
columbarius	L	dove-blue; dove-like. From columba, dove.	Impatiens columbaria*	H	D	C
columnaris	L	columned, from columna, pillar	Araucaria columnaris	H	DS	C
columellaris	L	columned, from columna, pillar	Araucaria columnaris	H	D	
comatus	L	tufted, long-haired; with comas. (Also comans.)	Hesperostipa comata	H	D	
comosus	L	tufted, long-haired; with comas. (Also comans.)	Hesperostipa comata		DS	C
commixtus	L	mingled together	Aloiampelos commixta	H	DS	C
communis	L	common	Commelina communis	H	DS	C
commutatus	L	changed	Pterostylis commutata	H	D	C
compactus	L	dense; joined together	Triticum compactum	H	DS	C
complanatus	L	flattened out, from complano, to level	Eremophila complanata	H	DS	
complexus	L	complex; clasped	Muehlenbeckia complexa	H	DS	C
complicatus	L	complicated; folded. From complico.	Indigofera complicata*	H	DS	
compositus	L	well-ordered	Oplismenus compositus		DS	
compressus	L	pressed together	Potamogeton compressus	H	DS	
comptus	L	adorned	Micropholis compta		D	
concavus	L	concave	Pterostylis concava	H	DS	
concinnus	L	neat; pretty	Acacia concinna	H	DS	
concolor	L	consistently coloured	Abies concolor	H	DS	C
condensus	L	crowded together; dense	Nothaphoebe condensa	H	D	
condensatus	L	crowded together; dense	Nothaphoebe condensa	H	DS	
confertus	L	crowded	Caladenia conferta	H	DS	
conformis	L	symmetrical, from conformatio	Dipterocarpus conformis		DS	
confusus	L	confused	Iris confusa	H	DS	C
congestus	L	congested; heaped	Senecio congestus	H	DS	C
conglomeratus	L	crowded; rolled up. From conglobo.	Eremophila conglomerata	H	DS	
conjugalis	L	joined	Dipteris conjugata		D	
conjugatus	L	joined	Dipteris conjugata		DS	
conjunctus	L	connected	Bidens conjuncta	H	D	
connatus	L	twin; connate	Alectryon connatus	H	DS	
conoideus	G	conical	Pandanus conoideus	H	DS	
conopseus	G	gnat-like	Gymnadenia conopsea	H	D	
consanguineus	L	kindred	Columnea consanguinea	H	D	
consolidus	L	stable, from solidus, complete	Xyris consolida*		D	
conspersus	L	sprinkled	Acacia conspersa	H	DS	
conspicuus	L	conspicuous	Eucalyptus conspicua	H	DS	C
constrictus	L	constricted, from constringo	Prasophyllum constrictum	H	DS	
contaminatus	L	contaminated	Lachenalia contaminata	H	S	
contiguus	L	contiguous	Lomaridium contiguum		DS	
continentalis	L	continental	Leptospermum continentale	H	DS	
contortus	L	twisted	Pinus contorta		DS	C
contractus	L	contracted	Festuca contracta	H	DS	
controversus	L	disputed	Cornus controversa	H	D	C
copallinus	L	gummy. Originally from Nahuatl.	Rhus copallinum	H	D	C
corallinus	G	coral-red	Aloe corallina	H	DS	
cordatus	L	heart-shaped; cordate	Tilia cordata	H	DS	C
cordiformis	L	heart-shaped; cordate	Tilia cordata	H	DS	C
coriaceus	L	leathery, from corium	Leptospermum coriaceum	H	DS	
coriarius	L	leathery, from corium	Leptospermum coriaceum	H	D	
corneus	L	horn-textured; corneous	Lithocarpus corneus*		DS	
corniculatus	L	horned	Eucalyptus cornuta	H	DS	C
cornifer	L	horned	Eucalyptus cornuta	H	D	
corniger	L	horned	Eucalyptus cornuta	H	D	C
cornutus	L	horned	Eucalyptus cornuta	H	DS	C
cornucopiae	L	horn of plenty	Melaleuca cornucopiae	H	D	
corollatus	L	with or like corollas, from corolla, little crown	Euphorbia corollata	H	DS	
coronans	L	wreathed, from corona, garland or crown; with a corona	Eucalyptus coronata	H	DS	
coronatus	L	wreathed, from corona, garland or crown; with a corona	Eucalyptus coronata	H	DS	
coronarius	L	used for garlands; forming a crown	Anemone coronaria	H	DS	C
corrugatus	L	wrinkled, from corrugo	Eucalyptus corrugata	H	DS	
coruscans	L	shaking, from corusco	Millettia coruscans*		D	
corymbosus	L	clustered, from corymbus; corymbose	Ipomoea corymbosa	H	DS	C
corynephorus	G	club	Caladenia corynephora		DS	
coryphaeus	L	leader	Sphagnum coryphaeum*		DS	
costatus	L	ribbed, from costa	Planchonella costata	H	DS	
cotyledon	G	small cup	Saxifraga cotyledon	H		
crassus	L	thick	Leavenworthia crassa	H	DS	
crassiusculus	L	thick	Leavenworthia crassa	H	DS	
creber	L	crowded; clustered; frequent. Feminine crebra, neuter crebrum.	Eucalyptus crebra		DS	
crenatus	L	scalloped; crenate	Mairia crenata	H	DS	C
crenulatus	L	scalloped; crenate	Mairia crenata	H	DS	
crepidatus	L	slipper-like; wearing sandals	Dendrobium crepidatum	H	D	
crepitans	L	creaking; rustling; rattling. From crepito.	Hura crepitans	H	D	
cretaceus	L	chalky, from creta	Caladenia cretacea	H	DS	
crinitus	L	long-haired	Coccothrinax crinita	H	DS	C
criniger	L	long-haired	Coccothrinax crinita		D	
crispus	L	curled; crisped	Rumex crispus	H	DS	C
crispatus	L	curled; crisped	Rumex crispus	H	DS	
cristatus	L	crested; tufted	Agropyron cristatum	H	DS	C
croceus	L	saffron-yellow	Iris crocea	H	DS	
crocatus	L	saffron-yellow	Iris crocea	H	D	
cruciatus	L	cruciform; tortured	Gentiana cruciata	H	DS	
crucifer	L	cruciform; tortured	Gentiana cruciata		D	
cruentus	L	bloodstained	Amaranthus cruentus	H	DS	C
crustatus	L	encrusted or hard-surfaced, from crusta; crustose	Saxifraga crustata	H	DS	
crystallinus	L	glistening, from crystallus, crystal	Mesembryanthemum crystallinum	H	DS	
ctenoides	G	comb-like	Melaleuca ctenoides		DS	
cucullaris	L	hooded, from cucullus; cucullate	Psittacanthus cucullaris		D	C
cucullatus	L	hooded, from cucullus; cucullate	Psittacanthus cucullaris	H	DS	
cultratus	L	blade-shaped, from culter, knife	Crassula cultrata	H	DS	
cultriformis	L	blade-shaped, from culter, knife	Crassula cultrata	H	DS	C
cuneatus	L	wedge-shaped; cuneate	Adenanthos cuneatus, Banksia cuneata	H	DS	C
cuneiformis	L	wedge-shaped; cuneate	Adenanthos cuneatus, Banksia cuneata	H	DS	
cupreus	L	coppery	Erythranthe cuprea	H	DS	
cupreatus	L	coppery	Erythranthe cuprea	H	D	
curtus	L	shortened	Pterostylis curta	H	DS	
curvatus	L	curved, from curvus	Ribes curvatum	H	DS	
cuspidatus	L	pointed, from cuspis, blade; cuspidate	Taxus cuspidata	H	DS	C
cyaneus	G	blue	Commelina cyanea	H	DS	C
cyclops	G	round-eyed	Acacia cyclops		D	
cylindraceus	L	cylindrical, from cylindrus	Imperata cylindrica	H	DS	C
cylindricus	L	cylindrical, from cylindrus	Imperata cylindrica	H	DS	C
cymbiformis	G	boat-shaped	Philotheca cymbiformis	H	DS	
cymosus	G	having cymes	Dichapetalum cymosum	H	D	
dactylifer	L	finger-bearing; finger-like. From dactyl, finger.	Phoenix dactylifera	H	DS	C
dactyloides	L	finger-bearing; finger-like. From dactyl, finger.	Phoenix dactylifera	H	DS	
dasyanthus	G	with thickly hairy flowers. (Also dasycarpus, thick-fruited.)	Pedicularis dasyantha	H	DS	
dealbatus	L	coated with white powder; whitened. From dealbo.	Melaleuca dealbata	H	DS	C
debilis	L	feeble	Helianthus debilis	H	DS	
decandrus	G	ten-stamened	Ceriops decandra	H	DS	
decapetalus	G	ten-petalled	Mentzelia decapetala	H	DS	C
decaphyllus	G	ten-leaved	Oxalis decaphylla		DS	
deciduus	L	deciduous, from decido, to fall off	Larix decidua	H	DS	C
decipiens	L	deceptive, from decipio	Agave decipiens	H	DS	C
declinatus	L	bending away or down, from declino; declinate	Yucca declinata	H	DS	
decolorans	L	faded or discoloured, from decolor	Achillea decolorans*		DS	
decompositus	L	divided, from de + composito	Lastreopsis decomposita	H	D	
decorus	L	decorated; decorous	Rhododendron decorum	H	D	C
decoratus	L	decorated; decorous	Rhododendron decorum	H	DS	
decorticans	L	stripping bark, from de + cortex	Geoffroea decorticans		DS	
decumanus	L	very large; of the tenth part	Canarium decumanum	H	D	
decumbens	L	reclining; decumbent. From decumbo.	Viola decumbens	H	DS	
decurrens	L	decurrent, from decurro	Calocedrus decurrens	H	DS	C
deflexus	L	bent (downward), from deflecto	Eucalyptus deflexa	H	DS	
deformis	L	disfigured, from deformo	Pheladenia deformis	H	DS	
dehiscens	L	split, from dehisco; dehiscent	Pentachondra dehiscens*		DS	
dejectus	L	low-lying or debased, from deiectus	Opuntia dejecta	H	DS	
delectus	L	beloved, from dilectus	Rubus delectus*		DS	
delicatus	L	delicate; delightful	Eucalyptus delicata	H	DS	
delicatissimus	L	most delightful	Plectranthus delicatissimus*		D	
deliciosus	L	delicious, from deliciae, delight	Monstera deliciosa	H	DS	C
deltoides	G	triangular; deltoid	Populus deltoides	H	D	C
deltoideus	G	triangular; deltoid	Populus deltoides	H	DS	C
demersus	L	submerged, from demergo	Ceratophyllum demersum	H	DS	C
deminutus	L	small, from deminutio	Bulbophyllum deminutum	H	S	
demissus	L	sunken; lowly	Eremophila demissa	H	DS	
dendricola	G	tree-dwelling; tree-loving	Lomaridium dendrophilum		D	
dendrophilus	G	tree-dwelling; tree-loving	Lomaridium dendrophilum	H	DS	
dendroideus	G	tree-like. (Also dendromorphus, tree-shaped.)	Dendrolycopodium dendroideum	H	DS	
densus	L	dense	Stenanthium densum	H	DS	
densatus	L	dense	Stenanthium densum	H	D	
dentatus	L	toothed; dentate	Banksia dentata	H	DS	C
dentifer	L	toothed; dentate	Banksia dentata		D	
dentosus	L	toothed; dentate	Banksia dentata		D	
denticulatus	L	toothed; dentate	Banksia dentata	H	DS	C
denudatus	L	denuded, from denudo	Magnolia denudata	H	DS	C
depauperatus	L	poorly formed, from de + pauper, poor	Trifolium depauperatum	H	DS	
dependens	L	hanging, from dependeo, to hang from	Bulbophyllum dependens	H	DS	
depressus	L	depressed; sunken; low	Gaultheria depressa	H	DS	
deserti	L	of deserts, from desertus	Agave deserti	H	DS	C
desertorum	L	of deserts, from desertus	Agave deserti	H	DS	
detersus	L	wiped clean, from detergeo, to wipe away	Connarus detersus*		DS	
detonsus	L	sheared, from detondeo	Hazardia detonsa	H	D	
deustus	L	scorched, from deuro	Penstemon deustus	H	DS	
diabolicus	G	two-horned; with a devilish appearance	Acer diabolicum	H	D	
diacanthus	G	double-thorned; double-spined	Ribes diacanthum	H	D	
diacritus	G	separated	Hieracium diacritum*		D	
diademus	G	crown-like. Stearn and Harrison list diadema.	Stylidium diademum*	H	D	
diandrus	G	two-stamened	Bromus diandrus	H	DS	
diaphanus	G	transparent	Cystopteris diaphana	H	DS	
dichotomus	G	split in two; dichotomous	Juncus dichotomus	H	DS	C
dichromus	G	two-coloured	Verticordia dichroma	H	D	
dichrous	G	two-coloured	Verticordia dichroma	H	D	
dicoccus	G	two-berried	Myriophyllum dicoccum*		D	
dictyotus	G	netted	Lepidium dictyotum		D	
didymus	G	twinned	Lepidium didymum	H	D	
difformis	L	irregular; unusual	Cyperus difformis	H	D	C
diffusus	L	spreading	Turnera diffusa	H	D	C
digitatus	L	digitate (like an open hand), from digitus, finger	Diphasiastrum digitatum	H	DS	C
dilatus	L	scattered; expanded. From differo.	Viburnum dilatatum		D	
dilatatus	L	scattered; expanded. From differo.	Viburnum dilatatum	H	DS	C
dilutus	L	diluted	Centaurea diluta	H	S	
dimidiatus	L	halved; divided unequally	Apodytes dimidiata	H	DS	
dimorphus	G	with two different forms	Caladenia dimorpha	H	DS	
diodon	G	two-toothed	Valerianella diodon*		D	
dioicus	G	dioecious	Aruncus dioicus	H	DS	C
dipetalus	G	two-petalled	Fraxinus dipetala	H	DS	
diphyllus	G	two-leaved	Cardamine diphylla	H	D	C
diplotrichus	G	having two kinds of hairs	Polypodium diplotrichum*		D	
dipterus	G	double-winged	Eucalyptus diptera	H	D	C
dipyrenus	G	two-fruited	Ilex dipyrena*	H	DS	
disciformis	G	arranged like a disc	Quercus disciformis	H	DS	
discoideus	G	disc-shaped; lacking rays; discoid	Margaritaria discoidea	H	DS	
discolor	L	of different colours; discolorous	Diospyros discolor	H	D	C
dispar	L	unequal; unusual in the genus	Boechera dispar	H	DS	
dispersus	L	scattered, from dispergo	Mentzelia dispersa	H	DS	
dissectus	L	segmented. (Also dissaepio.)	Lactuca dissecta	H	DS	
dissimilis	L	different (from the rest of the genus)	Acacia dissimilis	H	DS	
dissitus	L	spaced, from dissero, to plant here and there	Carex dissita		DS	
distachyus	G	two-branched; double-spiked	Ephedra distachya	H	DS	
distans	L	far apart	Hibiscadelphus distans	H	DS	
distichus	G	alternately opposed; in two ranks	Gasteria disticha	H	DS	C
distortus	L	distorted	Astragalus distortus	H	DS	
distylus	G	two-styled	Allocasuarina distyla	H	DS	
diurnus	L	day-blooming; by day	Cestrum diurnum	H	DS	
divaricatus	L	spreading wide, from divarico, to stretch apart; divaricate	Tabernaemontana divaricata	H	DS	C
divergens	L	spreading out, from di + vergo, to bend or turn	Acacia divergens	H	DS	
diversiformis	L	diverse	Romulea diversiformis*	H	DS	
divisus	L	divided, from divido	Gunniopsis divisa	H	DS	
dodecandrus	G	with twelve stamens	Cordia dodecandra	H	DS	
dolabratus	G	axe-shaped	Hypericum dolabriforme	H	DS	C
dolabriformis	G	axe-shaped	Hypericum dolabriforme	H	DS	
dolichostemon	G	having long stamens	Epimedium dolichostemon*		DS	
dolosus	L	deceptive	Artemisia dolosa*	H	DS	
domesticus	L	domestic; domesticated; of the house	Prunus domestica	H	DS	C
draco	L	dragon. (Also dracunculus, little dragon.)	Dracaena draco	H	DS	
drupaceus	G	stone-fruited; with drupes	Juniperus drupacea	H	DS	
drupifer	G	stone-fruited; with drupes	Juniperus drupacea	H	DS	
dubius	L	doubtful; moving two ways	Nepenthes dubia	H	DS	C
dulcis	L	sweet	Eleocharis dulcis	H	DS	C
dumetorum	L	of thickets or hedges, from dumus	Dioscorea dumetorum	H	DS	
dumosus	L	bushy	Ambrosia dumosa	H	DS	C
dunensis	L	of sand dunes. From Old English and Latin.	Epipactis dunensis		DS	
duplex	L	double	Thryptomene duplicata		DS	
duplicatus	L	double	Thryptomene duplicata	H	DS	
durabilis	L	lasting	Acacia durabilis		DS	
durus	L	hard	Sporobolus durus	H	DS	
duriusculus	L	hard	Sporobolus durus		DS	
dysentericus	G	for dysentery	Eugenia dysenterica		DS	
ebenus	L	ebony. (Also ebeneus.)	Diospyros ebenum, Alangium ebenaceum*	H	D	
ebenaceus	L	ebony. (Also ebeneus.)	Diospyros ebenum, Alangium ebenaceum*		D	
ebracteatus	L	without bracts, from bractea, metal foil	Eremaea ebracteata	H	DS	
eburneus	L	ivory (the colour)	Diuris eburnea	H	DS	C
echinatus	L	hedgehog, from echinus	Ceratophyllum echinatum	H	DS	
eclecteus	G	select. (Also eclectus.)	Rhododendron eclecteum*		D	
ecornutus	L	hornless, from cornu, horn, and cornutus	Impatiens ecornuta	H	DS	
edulis	L	edible	Passiflora edulis	H	DS	C
effusus	L	unrestrained	Milium effusum	H	DS	C
elasticus	G	rubber; with latex	Castilla elastica	H	DS	C
elatior	L	loftier	Primula elatior	H	D	C
elatus	L	lofty	Cyrtanthus elatus, Leionema elatius	H	DS	C
elegans	L	elegant	Zinnia elegans	H	DS	C
elegantulus	L	elegant	Zinnia elegans	H	DS	
elegantissimus	L	most elegant	Plerandra elegantissima	H	D	C
elephantum	L	of elephants, from elephantus	Lithocarpus elephantum*		D	
ellipsoidalis	G	ellipsoid	Quercus ellipsoidalis	H	DS	
ellipticus	G	elliptical	Adenanthos ellipticus	H	DS	C
elongatus	L	elongated, from longus	Podocarpus elongatus	H	DS	C
emarginatus	L	notched, from margo, a border; emarginate	Leptospermum emarginatum	H	DS	
emeticus	G	emetic	Trichilia emetica		DS	
eminens	L	eminent	Sorbus eminens	H	DS	
encliandrus	G	with half-enclosed stamens	Fuchsia encliandra*	H		
enneaphyllus	G	nine-leaved	Echinocereus enneacanthus	H	DS	C
ensatus	L	sword, from ensis; ensiform	Stylidium ensatum	H	DS	C
ensiformis	L	sword, from ensis; ensiform	Stylidium ensatum	H	DS	
entomophilus	G	insect-loving; entomophilous	Dioscorea entomophila*		D	
epigaeus	G	ground	Corallocarpus epigaeus*		DS	
epiphyllus	G	(flowers) on the leaves	Davallia epiphylla*	H	S	
epiphyticus	G	(growing) on a (different) plant	Dendrobium epiphyticum	H	S	
epipsilus	G	sparse	Viola epipsila		D	
episcopalis	G	episcopal	Heliconia episcopalis		D	
equestris	L	equestrian	Leionema equestre	H	D	
erectus	L	erect	Pterostylis erecta	H	DS	C
erinaceus	L	hedgehog	Aloe erinacea	H	D	
eriophorus	G	wool-bearing	Cirsium eriophorum		DS	
erosus	L	erose	Eucalyptus erosa	H	DS	
erraticus	L	erratic; non-generic	Jacobaea erratica*		DS	
erubescens	L	blushing, from erubesco	Lophospermum erubescens	H	DS	
erythrocarpus	G	red-fruited	Gahnia erythrocarpa	H	DS	
esculentus	L	edible	Abelmoschus esculentus	H	DS	C
estriatus	L	unstriped	Ilex estriata*		DS	
etuberosus	L	without tubers, from tuber, a swelling	Solanum etuberosum		DS	
euchlorus	G	fresh-green	Praecereus euchlorus	H	D	
eudoxus	G	reputable	Rhododendron eudoxum		DS	
evectus	L	elevated	Angiopteris evecta		D	
evertus	L	overturned, from everto	Alsophila everta		D	
exaltatus	L	lofty, from altus	Nephrolepis exaltata	H	DS	C
exaratus	L	engraved, from exaro	Agrostis exarata	H	DS	
exasperatus	L	rough, from exaspero, to roughen	Bulbophyllum exasperatum		DS	
excavatus	L	hollowed out, from excavo	Calochortus excavatus	H	DS	
excellens	L	excellent	Mimulopsis excellens*	H	D	
excelsior	L	loftier	Fraxinus excelsior	H	D	
excelsus	L	lofty	Alectryon excelsus	H	DS	
excisus	L	excised	Manilkara excisa	H	DS	
excorticatus	L	peeling or bare, from cortex, bark	Fuchsia excorticata	H	D	
exiguus	L	paltry	Acianthus exiguus	H	DS	C
eximius	L	distinguished	Protea eximia	H	DS	C
exitiosus	L	toxic	Tanaecium exitiosum*		D	
exoticus	G	exotic; introduced	Musa exotica		DS	
expansus	L	expanded, from pando	Goniothalamus expansus	H	DS	
explodens	L	exploding	Ronnbergia explodens*		DS	
exsculptus	L	carved, from exsculpo	Pronephrium exsculptum*		DS	
exsertus	L	protruding; exserted	Acianthus exsertus	H	DS	
exsurgens	L	rising, from exsurgo	Galium exsurgens*		DS	
extensus	L	extended	Eucalyptus extensa	H	DS	
exudans	L	exuding, from exudo and exsudans	Acacia exudans		DS	
facetus	L	fine; refined	Rhododendron facetum	H		
falcatus	L	sickle	Sarcochilus falcatus, Cyrtanthus falcatus, Pterostylis falcata	H	DS	C
falciformis	L	sickle	Sarcochilus falcatus, Cyrtanthus falcatus, Pterostylis falcata	H	DS	
falcinellus	L	sickle	Sarcochilus falcatus, Cyrtanthus falcatus, Pterostylis falcata	H	D	
fallax	L	false	Eremophila fallax	H	DS	
farinaceus	L	farinaceous, from farina, flour	Salvia farinacea	H	DS	
farinosus	L	farinaceous, from farina, flour	Salvia farinacea	H	DS	
fasciatus	L	bundled, from fascis; fascicled	Eremophila fasciata	H	DS	C
fascicularis	L	bundled, from fascis; fascicled	Eremophila fasciata	H	D	
fasciculatus	L	bundled, from fascis; fascicled	Eremophila fasciata	H	DS	
fastigiatus	L	pointed; fastigiate	Leptospermum fastigiatum, Boronia fastigiata, Verticordia fastigiata	H	DS	
fastuosus	L	proud	Aerangis fastuosa	H	DS	C
fatuus	L	foolish; insipid	Avena fatua	H	D	
febrifugus	L	anti-fever, from febris, fever	Dichroa febrifuga	H	D	C
fecundus	L	fruitful	Prasophyllum fecundum	H	S	
femineus	L	feminine. (Also femina.)	Restio femineus*		DS	
fenestralis	L	windowed, from fenestra; fenestrate	Beccariophoenix fenestralis	H	DS	
ferax	L	fruitful	Fargesia ferax*	H	DS	
ferox	L	fierce	Aconitum ferox, Datura ferox	H	DS	C
ferreus	L	iron	Mesua ferrea	H	DS	
ferrugineus	L	rusty, from ferrugo	Lasiopetalum ferrugineum	H	DS	C
fertilis	L	fertile	Sporobolus fertilis	H	DS	
ferus	L	feral	none		DS	
festivus	L	pretty; festive	Begonia festiva	H	D	
festalis	L	pretty; festive	Begonia festiva	H	D	
fibrosus	L	fibrous, from fibra	Dicksonia fibrosa	H	DS	
fibrillosus	L	fibrous, from fibra	Dicksonia fibrosa	H	DS	
fictus	L	false	Brachyotum fictum		D	
filamentosus	L	filamented or filiform, from filum, filament	Caladenia filamentosa	H	DS	
filiformis	L	filamented or filiform, from filum, filament	Caladenia filamentosa		DS	C
filarius	L	filamented or filiform, from filum, filament	Caladenia filamentosa	H	D	
filifer	L	filamented or filiform, from filum, filament	Caladenia filamentosa		D	C
filicinus	L	fern, from filix. (Also filiculoides.)	Azolla filiculoides	H	DS	
fimbriatus	L	fringed, from fimbriae, fringe	Corybas fimbriatus, Eremaea fimbriata	H	DS	
fimbriatulus	L	fringed, from fimbriae, fringe	Corybas fimbriatus, Eremaea fimbriata		D	C
firmus	L	firm	Aconitum firmum	H	DS	
fissilis	L	fissured; with fissures	Melaleuca fissurata	H	DS	
fissuratus	L	fissured; with fissures	Melaleuca fissurata	H	DS	
fissus	L	fissured; with fissures	Melaleuca fissurata	H	DS	
fistulosus	L	hollow, from fistula, tube	Allium fistulosum	H	DS	C
flabellatus	L	fanned-out, from flabellum	Hymenophyllum flabellatum, Eremophila flabellata	H	DS	C
flabellifer	L	fanned-out, from flabellum	Hymenophyllum flabellatum, Eremophila flabellata	H	D	
flabelliformis	L	fanned-out, from flabellum	Hymenophyllum flabellatum, Eremophila flabellata	H	DS	
flaccidus	L	limp, from flacceo; flaccid. (Also flaccus.)	Yucca flaccida, Caladenia flaccida	H	DS	C
flagellum	L	whip. (Also flagellifer.)	Rubus flagellaris		DS	
flagellaris	L	whip. (Also flagellifer.)	Rubus flagellaris	H	DS	
flagelliformis	L	whip. (Also flagellifer.)	Rubus flagellaris	H	DS	
flammula	L	flame	Alloxylon flammeum, Melaleuca flammea		D	
flammeus	L	flame	Alloxylon flammeum, Melaleuca flammea	H	DS	
flavus	L	yellow	Glaucium flavum	H	DS	C
flavissimus	L	bright yellow	Zephyranthes flavissima*	H	D	
flavescens	L	light yellow, from flavesco	Diuris flavescens	H	DS	C
flavens	L	light yellow, from flavesco	Diuris flavescens	H	D	
flaveolus	L	light yellow, from flavesco	Diuris flavescens	H	DS	
flavidus	L	light yellow, from flavesco	Diuris flavescens	H	DS	
flexilis	L	flexible	Pinus flexilis	H	DS	C
flexuosus	L	twisted; flexuous	Agonis flexuosa, Thelymitra flexuosa	H	DS	C
floccosus	L	woolly, from floccus, a lock of hair	Limnanthes floccosa	H	DS	
flocculosus	L	woolly, from floccus, a lock of hair	Limnanthes floccosa	H	D	
flocciger	L	woolly, from floccus, a lock of hair	Limnanthes floccosa	H	D	
floribundus	L	flower-abundant, from abundo, to abound	Myoporum floribundum	H	DS	C
floridus	L	flowery	Cornus florida	H	DS	C
florifer	L	flowery	Cornus florida	H	DS	C
fluitans	L	floating, from fluito	Glyceria fluitans	H	DS	
fluviatilis	L	river	Melaleuca fluviatilis	H	DS	C
fluvialis	L	river	Melaleuca fluviatilis	H	D	
foeminus	L	feminine	Lysimachia foemina		DS	
foetidus	L	fetid, from foedo	Passiflora foetida	H	DS	C
foetidissimus	L	most fetid	Iris foetidissima	H	D	
foliosus	L	leafy, from folium	Narcissus foliosus, Lepidium foliosum	H	DS	C
foliatus	L	leafy, from folium	Narcissus foliosus, Lepidium foliosum	H	DS	
foliaceus	L	leafy, from folium	Narcissus foliosus, Lepidium foliosum	H	DS	
foliolosus	L	leaflet, from folio; with folioles	Melaleuca foliolosa	H	DS	
foliolotus	L	leaflet, from folio; with folioles	Melaleuca foliolosa	H	D	
follicularis	L	follicled, from folliculus, a small bag	Cephalotus follicularis	H	DS	
fontanus	L	fountain	Asplenium fontanum, Cerastium fontanum	H	DS	
fontinalis	L	fountain	Asplenium fontanum, Cerastium fontanum		DS	
formosus	L	beautiful	Calothamnus formosus	H	DS	C
foveolatus	L	dimpled, from fovea, a small pit; foveolate	Cryptocarya foveolata, Chionanthus foveolatus	H	DS	
fragilis	L	fragile	Opuntia fragilis	H	DS	C
fragrans	L	fragrant	Myristica fragrans	H	DS	C
fragrantissimus	L	most fragrant	Lonicera fragrantissima	H	D	C
frigidus	L	frigid (the habitat)	Petasites frigidus	H	DS	C
frondosus	L	leafy; with fronds	Bidens frondosa	H	DS	C
frumentaceus	L	grain, from frumentum	Echinochloa frumentacea		D	
fruticosus	L	shrubby	Phlomis fruticosa	H	DS	C
frutescens	L	shrubby	Phlomis fruticosa	H	DS	C
fruticans	L	shrubby	Phlomis fruticosa	H	D	C
fruticulosus	L	shrubby	Phlomis fruticosa	H	D	
fruticicola	L	shrubland. (Also fruticola.)	Bulbophyllum fruticicola, Henckelia fruticola*		D	
fucatus	L	painted	Trifolium fucatum	H	DS	
fugax	L	fleeting; fugacious	Fontainea fugax	H	DS	
fulgens	L	shining	Fuchsia fulgens	H	DS	C
fulgidus	L	shining	Fuchsia fulgens	H	DS	C
fuliginosus	L	sooty	Caladenia fuliginosa	H	DS	
fullonum	L	of fullers	Dipsacus fullonum		D	
fulvus	L	tawny	Iris fulva, Caladenia fulva	H	DS	C
fulvidus	L	light tawny	Austroderia fulvida	H	DS	C
fulvescens	L	light tawny	Austroderia fulvida	H	DS	
fumidus	L	smoky	Thismia fumida*		DS	
fumosus	L	smoky	Senegalia fumosa*		DS	
funebris	L	funereal	Cupressus funebris	H	D	
fungosus	L	fungal, from fungus	Balanophora fungosa	H	DS	
funiculatus	L	cord, from funiculus; funicled	Arenaria funiculata		DS	
furcatus	L	forked, from furca; furcate	Iris furcata	H	DS	
furcans	L	forked, from furca; furcate	Iris furcata	H	D	
furfuraceus	L	scaly, from furfures, bran	Zieria furfuracea		DS	C
furiens	L	maddening, from furio	Cirsium furiens*		D	
fuscus	L	dark brown	Prasophyllum fuscum	H	DS	C
fuscatus	L	dark brown	Prasophyllum fuscum	H	DS	
fusiformis	L	spindle-shaped, from fusus	Billardiera fusiformis		DS	
futilis	L	useless	Bulbophyllum futile	H	D	
galactinus	G	milky	Rhododendron galactinum		D	
galanthus	G	milky-flowered	Allium galanthum	H	DS	
galeatus	L	helmeted	Verticordia galeata	H	DS	
galericulatus	L	helmeted	Verticordia galeata	H	DS	
gelidus	L	frigid	Campanula gelida	H	DS	
geminatus	L	paired, from geminus, twin-born	Quercus geminata		DS	
gemmatus	L	budding, from gemma, bud	Caladenia gemmata	H	DS	
gemmifer	L	budding, from gemma, bud	Caladenia gemmata	H	DS	
geniculatus	L	jointed; bent	Geum geniculatum	H	DS	
geocarpus	G	buried-fruit	Macrotyloma geocarpum		DS	
geometricus	L	geometrical	Weinmannia geometrica*		D	
geometrizans	G	geometrical	Myrtillocactus geometrizans		D	
gibbus	L	gibbous; humped	Utricularia gibba	H	DS	
gibberosus	L	gibbous; humped	Utricularia gibba	H	D	
gibbosus	L	gibbous; humped	Utricularia gibba	H	DS	
gigas	L	giant	Goniothalamus giganteus		DS	C
giganteus	L	giant	Goniothalamus giganteus	H	DS	
gilvus	L	light yellow	Quercus gilva	H	DS	
glaber	L	smooth (feminine glabra, neuter glabrum)	Calothamnus glaber	H	DS	C
glabellus	L	smooth (feminine glabra, neuter glabrum)	Calothamnus glaber	H	DS	
glaberrimus	L	smoothest	Melaleuca glaberrima		D	C
glabrescens	L	balding	Adenanthos glabrescens, Leptospermum glabrescens, Kunzea glabrescens	H	DS	C
glabriusculus	L	semi-smooth	Atriplex glabriuscula	H	DS	C
glabratus	L	semi-smooth	Atriplex glabriuscula	H	DS	
glacialis	L	glacial	Epacris glacialis	H	DS	
gladiiformis	L	sword, from gladius	Lepidosperma gladiatum		D	
gladiatus	L	sword, from gladius	Lepidosperma gladiatum	H	D	
glandiformis	L	glandular. (Also glanduliger.)	Anopterus glandulosus		D	C
glandulosus	L	glandular. (Also glanduliger.)	Anopterus glandulosus	H	DS	
glandulifer	L	glandular. (Also glanduliger.)	Anopterus glandulosus	H	DS	
glaphyrus	G	polished	Erica glaphyra*		D	
glaucus	L	glaucous	Casuarina glauca, Monotoca glauca, Cyathodes glauca	H	DS	
glaucoides	L	glaucous	Casuarina glauca, Monotoca glauca, Cyathodes glauca		D	C
glaucescens	L	glaucescent	Iris glaucescens	H	DS	C
glischrus	G	sticky	Ageratina glischra*		D	
globifer	L	globe-bearing, from globus, globe	Melaleuca globifera	H	DS	C
globulifer	L	globe-bearing, from globus, globe	Melaleuca globifera	H	DS	
globosus	L	globe. (Also globulus.)	Physaria globosa, Gomphrena globosa	H	DS	C
globularis	L	globe. (Also globulus.)	Physaria globosa, Gomphrena globosa	H	DS	
globulosus	L	globe. (Also globulus.)	Physaria globosa, Gomphrena globosa	H	DS	
glomeratus	L	globular, from glomero	Campanula glomerata	H	DS	
glomerulatus	L	globular, from glomero	Campanula glomerata		DS	C
gloriosus	L	glorious	Wahlenbergia gloriosa	H	D	C
glumaceus	L	glumed	Conospermum glumaceum	H	DS	
glutinosus	L	glutinous, from gluten, glue	Alnus glutinosa, Salvia glutinosa	H	DS	C
gongylodes	G	bulbous	Cissus gongylodes*	H	DS	
goniocalyx	G	angled-calyx	Eucalyptus goniocalyx	H	DS	
gracilis	L	slender	Marsippospermum gracile, Prasophyllum gracile, Cautleya gracilis	H	DS	C
gracilentus	L	slender	Marsippospermum gracile, Prasophyllum gracile, Cautleya gracilis	H	D	
gracilior	L	more graceful	Afrocarpus gracilior		D	
gracillimus	L	most graceful	Caladenia gracillima		D	
gramineus	L	grassy	Iris graminea, Pterostylis graminea	H	DS	C
grammopetalus	G	striped-petal, from grammo	Potentilla grammopetala*		D	
grandis	L	large	Banksia grandis, Micromyrtus grandis	H	DS	C
graniticus	L	granite	Calothamnus graniticus	H	DS	
granulatus	L	granular, from granum	Zieria granulata	H	DS	
granulosus	L	granular, from granum	Zieria granulata	H	DS	
gratus	L	gratifying	Encephalartos gratus	H	DS	
gratissimus	L	most gratifying	Croton gratissimus	H	D	
graveolens	L	strong-smelling	Durio graveolens	H	DS	C
griseus	L	grey	Eucalyptus grisea	H	DS	C
grosseserratus	L	saw-toothed, from serratus, serrated. Stearn hyphenates grosse-serratus.	Veronica grosseserrata*	H	DS	C
grossus	L	coarse; large	Banksia grossa, Eucalyptus grossa	H	DS	
gruinus	L	crane, from grus	Erodium gruinum*		D	
gummifer	L	gummy	Ceratopetalum gummiferum	H	D	
gummosus	L	gummy	Ceratopetalum gummiferum	H	DS	
guttatus	L	spotted, from gutta	Tuberaria guttata	H	DS	C
gymnocarpus	G	naked-fruited	Rosa gymnocarpa	H	DS	
gyrans	L	circling, from gyrus	Andropogon gyrans		DS	
habrotrichus	G	soft-haired	Alseodaphne habrotricha*		D	
haematodes	G	bloody. (Also haematacanthus.)	Ferocactus haematacanthus, Cymbidium haematodes*	H	D	
halophilus	G	salt-loving	Iris halophila	H	DS	
hamatus	L	hooked	Nepenthes hamata	H	DS	
hamosus	L	hooked	Nepenthes hamata	H	DS	
hastatus	L	spear, from hastatus; hastate	Salix hastata, Caladenia hastata	H	DS	C
hastilis	L	spear, from hastatus; hastate	Salix hastata, Caladenia hastata		DS	
hastulatus	L	spear, from hastatus; hastate	Salix hastata, Caladenia hastata	H	D	
hastifer	L	spear-bearing	Thelocactus hastifer		DS	
hebecarpus	G	fuzzy-fruited	Senna hebecarpa	H	D	C
helix	G	helix	Hedera helix	H	D	
helodes	G	marsh	Echinochloa helodes*	H	D	
helvolus	L	light yellow-brown	Strophostyles helvola	H	D	
hemisphaericus	L	hemispherical, from sphaera, sphere	Quercus hemisphaerica	H	DS	
hemitrichotus	G	half-hairy	Rhododendron hemitrichotum*		D	
hepaticus	G	liver-coloured	Anemone hepatica	H	S	
heptaphyllus	G	seven-leaved	Ipomoea heptaphylla	H	DS	C
herbaceus	L	herbaceous, from herba, herb	Smilax herbacea	H	DS	C
hesperus	G	western	Parietaria hespera		D	
heterolepis	G	diverse-scaled	Sporobolus heterolepis		D	C
heterophyllus	G	diverse-leaved	Cistus heterophyllus	H	DS	C
heterochromus	G	diverse-coloured	Utricularia heterochroma		D	
heterodoxus	G	non-generic	Heliamphora heterodoxa	H	D	
heteromorphus	G	diverse-formed; heteromorphic	Dypsis heteromorpha		D	
hexagonus	G	hexagonal	Iris hexagona	H	DS	
hexandrus	G	six-stamened	Leersia hexandra	H	DS	C
hians	L	wide-open, from hio, to gape	Salvia hians	H	DS	
hibernus	L	winter	Austrocactus hibernus*		DS	
hiemalis	L	winter. (Also hyemalis.)	Caladenia hiemalis	H	DS	C
hieroglyphicus	G	hieroglyphic	Vriesea hieroglyphica		D	
hircinus	L	goat	Hypericum hircinum	H	DS	
hirsutus	L	hairy; hirsute	Calothamnus hirsutus, Stapelia hirsuta	H	DS	C
hirsutulus	L	hairy; hirsute	Calothamnus hirsutus, Stapelia hirsuta	H	D	
hirsutissimus	L	hairiest	Lupinus hirsutissimus	H	D	C
hirtus	L	hairy	Mimetes hirtus	H	DS	C
hirtellus	L	hairy	Mimetes hirtus	H	D	
hispidus	L	bristly; hispid. (Also hispidulus.)	Acalypha hispida	H	DS	C
holocarpus	G	whole-carpelled; whole-fruited	Atriplex holocarpa		DS	
hololeucus	G	all-white	Artemisia hololeuca*		D	
holosericeus	G	silk-covered	Melaleuca holosericea	H	D	
homolepis	G	evenly scaled	Abies homolepis		D	C
horizontalis	G	horizontal	Cotoneaster horizontalis	H	DS	C
horridus	L	prickly	Banksia horrida, Hakea horrida	H	DS	
hortensis	L	garden, from hortus. (Also hortensius.)	Anemone hortensis	H	DS	C
hortorum	L	garden, from hortus. (Also hortensius.)	Anemone hortensis	H	DS	
hortulanus	L	garden, from hortus. (Also hortensius.)	Anemone hortensis	H	DS	
humifusus	L	humifuse; low-spreading, from humus, ground, and fusus, spread out	Opuntia humifusa, Scaevola humifusa, Boronia humifusa	H	DS	C
humilis	L	low	Jasminum humile, Rivina humilis, Allocasuarina humilis	H	DS	C
hyalinus	L	glass, from hyalus; hyaline	Melica hyalina	H	DS	
hybridus	L	hybrid, from hybrida, mongrel	Trifolium hybridum	H	DS	C
hylaeus	G	forest	Theobroma hylaeum*	H	D	
hylophilus	G	forest-loving	Piper hylophilum		D	
hymenodes	G	filmy	Alsophila hymenodes		D	
hyperboreus	G	far northern	Bidens hyperborea	H	DS	
hypochondriacus	G	melancholy	Amaranthus hypochondriacus	H	D	C
hypogaeus	G	underground	Arachis hypogaea	H	DS	
hypoglaucus	G	glaucous-backed	Cissus hypoglauca	H	DS	
hypokerina	G	waxy-backed	Berberis hypokerina		D	
hypophaeus	G	dark-backed	Quercus hypophaea		DS	
hypoleucus	G	white-backed	Lobelia hypoleuca	H	DS	
hypophyllus	G	hypophyllous	Phyllocladus hypophyllus	H	DS	
hystrix	G	porcupine	Schizolaena hystrix	H	D	C

== See also ==
- Glossary of botanical terms
- List of Greek and Latin roots in English
- List of Latin and Greek words commonly used in systematic names
- List of plant genus names with etymologies: A–C, D–K, L–P, Q–Z
- List of plant genera named after people: A–C, D–J, K–P, Q–Z
- List of plant family names with etymologies
