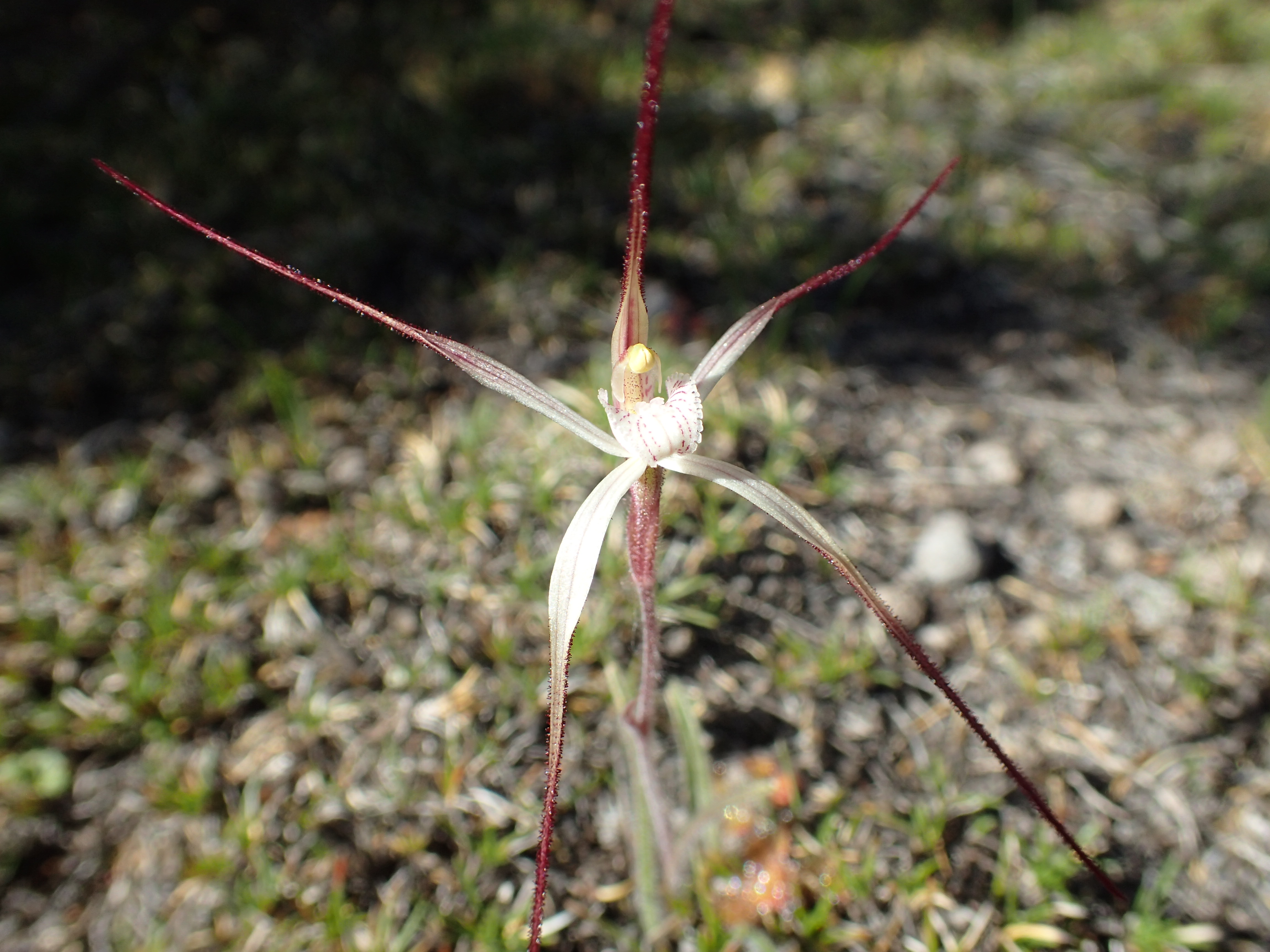
- In Dragon Rocks Nature Reserve

Scientific classification
- Kingdom: Plantae
- Clade: Embryophytes
- Clade: Tracheophytes
- Clade: Spermatophytes
- Clade: Angiosperms
- Clade: Monocots
- Order: Asparagales
- Family: Orchidaceae
- Subfamily: Orchidoideae
- Tribe: Diurideae
- Genus: Caladenia
- Species: C. dimidia

Binomial name
- Caladenia dimidia Hopper & A.P.Br.

Synonyms
- Calonema dimidium (Hopper & A.P.Br.) D.L.Jones & M.A.Clem.; Jonesiopsis dimidia (Hopper & A.P.Br.) D.L.Jones & M.A.Clem.

= Caladenia dimidia =

Chameleon orchid

Species of orchid

Caladenia dimidia, commonly known as the chameleon orchid, is a species of orchid endemic to the south-west of Western Australia. It has a single hairy leaf and one or two yellow, cream-coloured or pinkish flowers. It is a variable species, similar to the Joseph's spider orchid (C. polychroma) but has a more northerly distribution and smaller flowers.

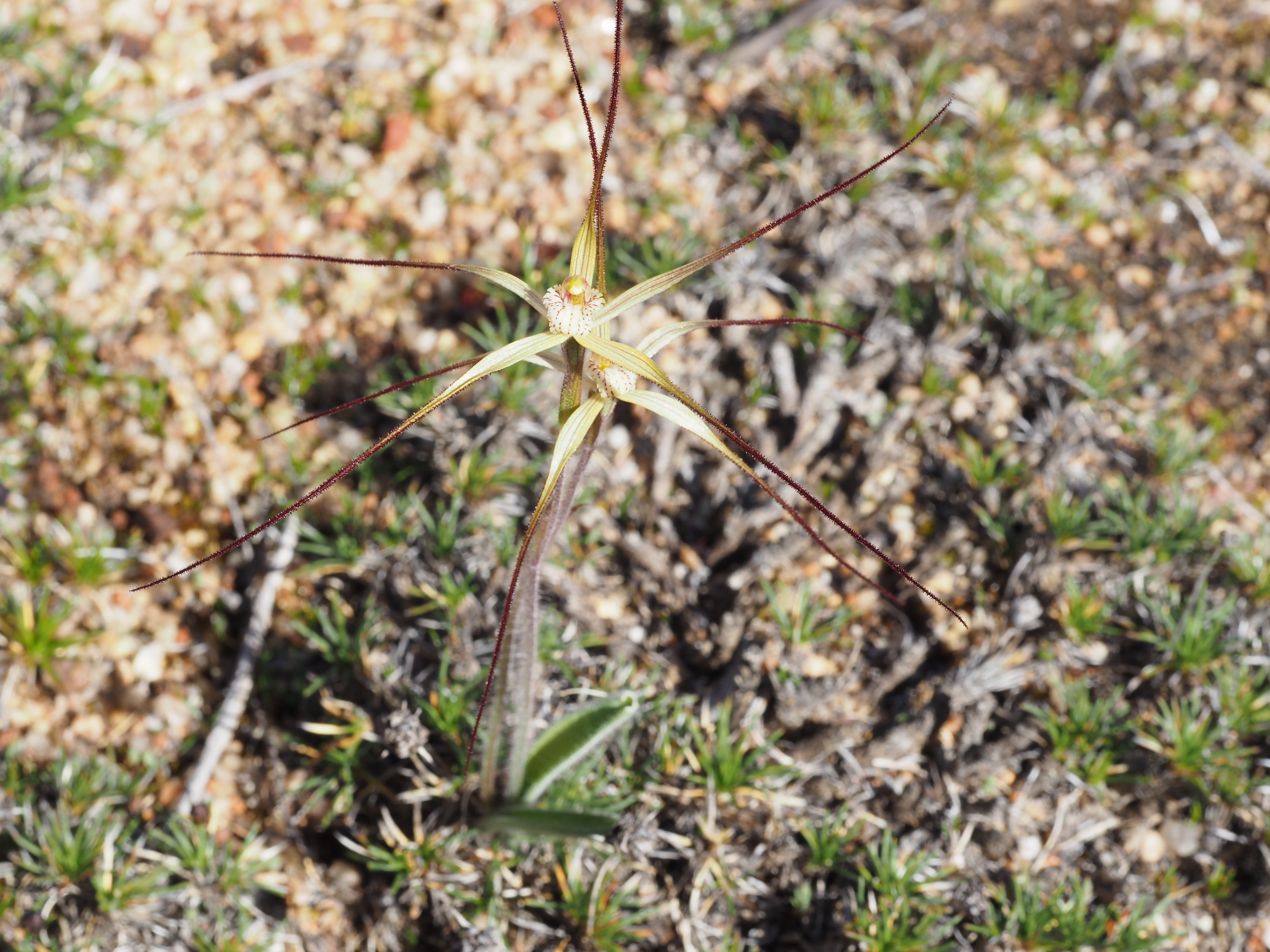
Habit

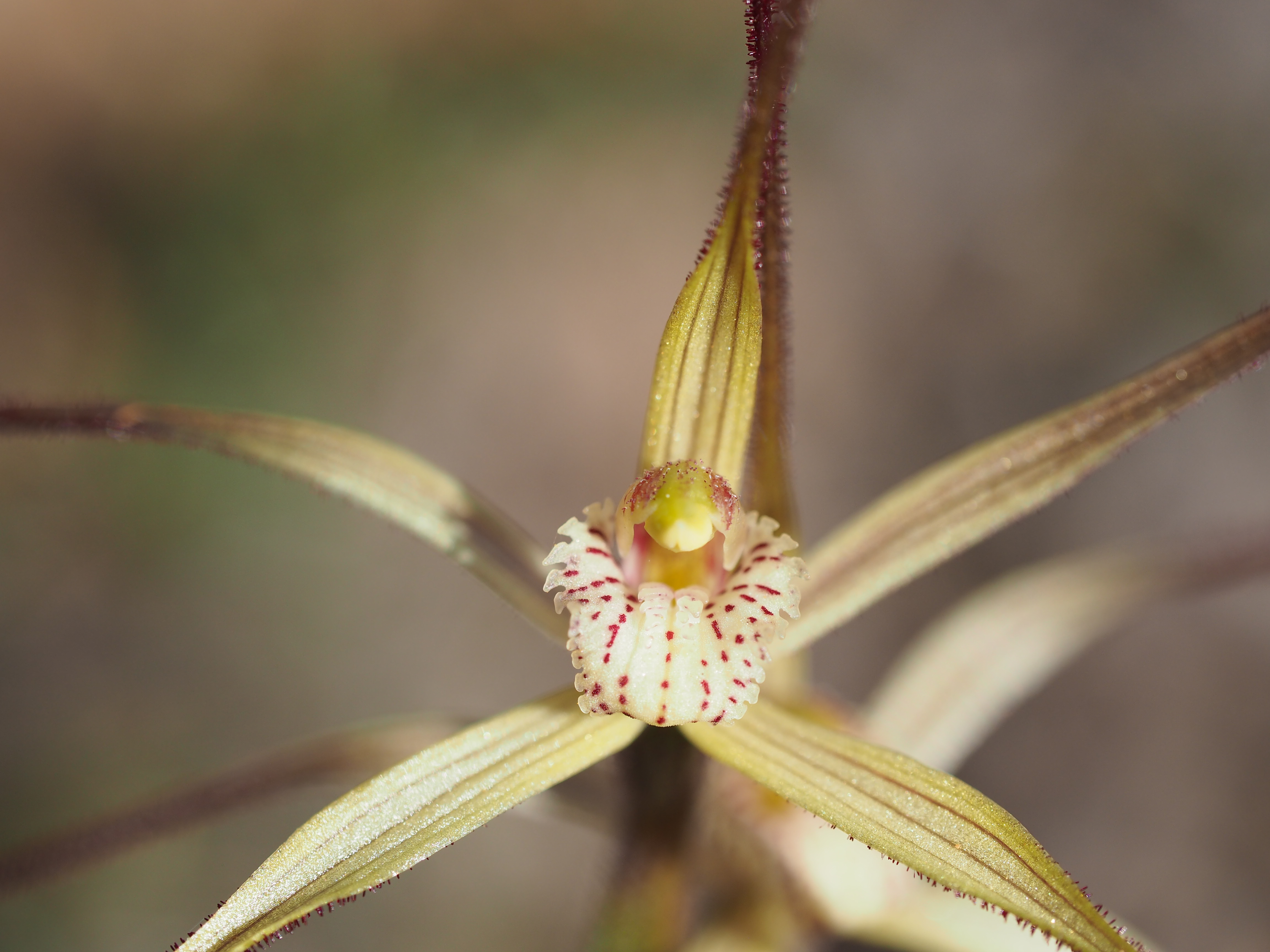
Close-up detail of labellum

== Description ==
Caladenia dimidia is a terrestrial, perennial, deciduous, herb with an underground tuber and which grows as a solitary plant or in small clumps. It has a single, erect, linear, hairy leaf, 7–15 cm (3–6 in) long and 2–3 mm (0.08–0.1 in) wide. The leaf is pale green and has purple-red blotches near its base.

One or two yellow to cream-coloured, sometimes pinkish flowers, with dark maroon markings are borne on a stalk 15–30 cm (6–10 in) tall. The flowers are 7–11 cm (3–4 in) long and 4–9 cm (2–4 in) wide. The bases of the sepals and petals are linear to lance-shaped and held stiffly for about one-third, then suddenly narrow to a dark brown, densely glandular thread-like section. The dorsal sepal is erect, linear to lance-shaped, 4.5–7 cm (2–3 in) long, 2–3 mm (0.08–0.1 in) wide at the base and has its edges slightly turned inwards. The lateral sepals are spreading and downcurved, 5–7.5 cm (2–3 in) long and 2–3 mm (0.08–0.1 in) wide at the base and are inclined downwards. The petals are 4.6–6.5 cm (2–3 in) long and 2–3 mm (0.08–0.1 in) wide at the base, spread widely near the base then incline downwards. The labellum is white or pale yellow with maroon stripes, spots and blotches. It is comparatively small, diamond-shaped, 7–11 mm (0.3–0.4 in) long and 6–8 mm (0.2–0.3 in) wide and curves downward at the front. The sides of the labellum curve upwards and have a fringe of small teeth decreasing in size towards the front of the labellum. There are 6 to 14 creamy-white or pale pink, narrow anvil-shaped calli in two rows in the centre of the labellum for at least half of its length. Flowering occurs from July to late September. This species is similar to Caladenia polychroma but its flowers, especially its labellum is smaller.

== Taxonomy and naming ==
Caladenia dimidia was first formally described by Stephen Hopper and Andrew Brown in 2001 from a specimen collected by Hopper south-east of Hyden. The description was published in Nuytsia. The specific epithet (dimidia) is Latin word meaning "half" referring to the characters of this species being half-way between those of C. polychroma and C. paradoxa.

== Distribution and habitat ==
The chameleon orchid is a common orchid in the eastern wheatbelt from near Paynes Find to near Ravensthorpe in the Avon Wheatbelt, Coolgardie, Esperance Plains, Geraldton Sandplains, Jarrah Forest, and Mallee biogeographic regions where it grows in a range of habitats that are generally wet in winter.

== Conservation ==
Caladenia dimidia is classified as "not threatened" by the Western Australian Government Department of Parks and Wildlife.
