= Caladenia caesarea subsp. transiens =

Dwarf mustard spider orchid

Conservation status
- Priority One — Poorly Known Taxa (DEC)

Scientific classification
- Kingdom: Plantae
- Clade: Tracheophytes
- Clade: Angiosperms
- Clade: Monocots
- Order: Asparagales
- Family: Orchidaceae
- Subfamily: Orchidoideae
- Tribe: Diurideae
- Genus: Caladenia
- Species: C. caesarea
- Subspecies: C. c. subsp. transiens

Trinomial name
- Caladenia caesarea subsp. transiens Hopper & A.P.Br.

Subspecies of orchid

Caladenia caesarea subsp. transiens, commonly known as the dwarf mustard spider orchid, is a plant in the orchid family Orchidaceae and is endemic to the south-west of Western Australia. It has a single spreading, hairy leaf and up to three small lemon-yellow flowers with red stripes. It is only known from a single small population near the town of Williams.

== Description ==
Caladenia caesarea subsp. transiens is a terrestrial, perennial, deciduous, herb with an underground tuber and a single erect, hairy leaf 10–15 cm (4–6 in) long and about 3 mm (0.1 in) wide. There are up to three lemon-yellow flowers borne on a stem 20–30 cm (8–10 in) high and each flower is 8–10 cm (3–4 in) long and 5–7 cm (2–3 in) wide. The lateral sepals and petals spread widely. The labellum is lemon-yellow coloured with brownish-red stripes, projects prominently with a curled tip, has an irregularly serrated edge and two rows of shiny yellow calli along its centre. Flowering occurs between September and October and is followed by a non-fleshy, dehiscent capsule containing a large number of seeds.

== Taxonomy and naming ==
This orchid was formally described by Karel Domin in 1912 and given the name Caladenia filamentosa subsp. caesarea. Domin's description was published in Journal of the Linnean Society, Botany but in 1989 Mark Clements and Stephen Hopper raised it to species status. In 2001 Hopper and Andrew Brown described three subspecies, including subspecies transiens and the descriptions of these subspecies were published in Nuytsia. The epithet (transiens) alludes to the shape of the labellum, which is intermediate between that of Caladenia filamentosa and the other subspecies of Caladenia caesarea.

== Distribution and habitat ==
Dwarf mustard spider orchid only occurs near Williams in the Jarrah Forest biogeographic region where it grows under dense rock sheoak and wandoo trees.

== Conservation ==
Caladenia caesarea subsp. transiens is classified as "Priority One" by the Government of Western Australia Department of Parks and Wildlife, meaning that it is known from only one or a few locations which are potentially at risk.
