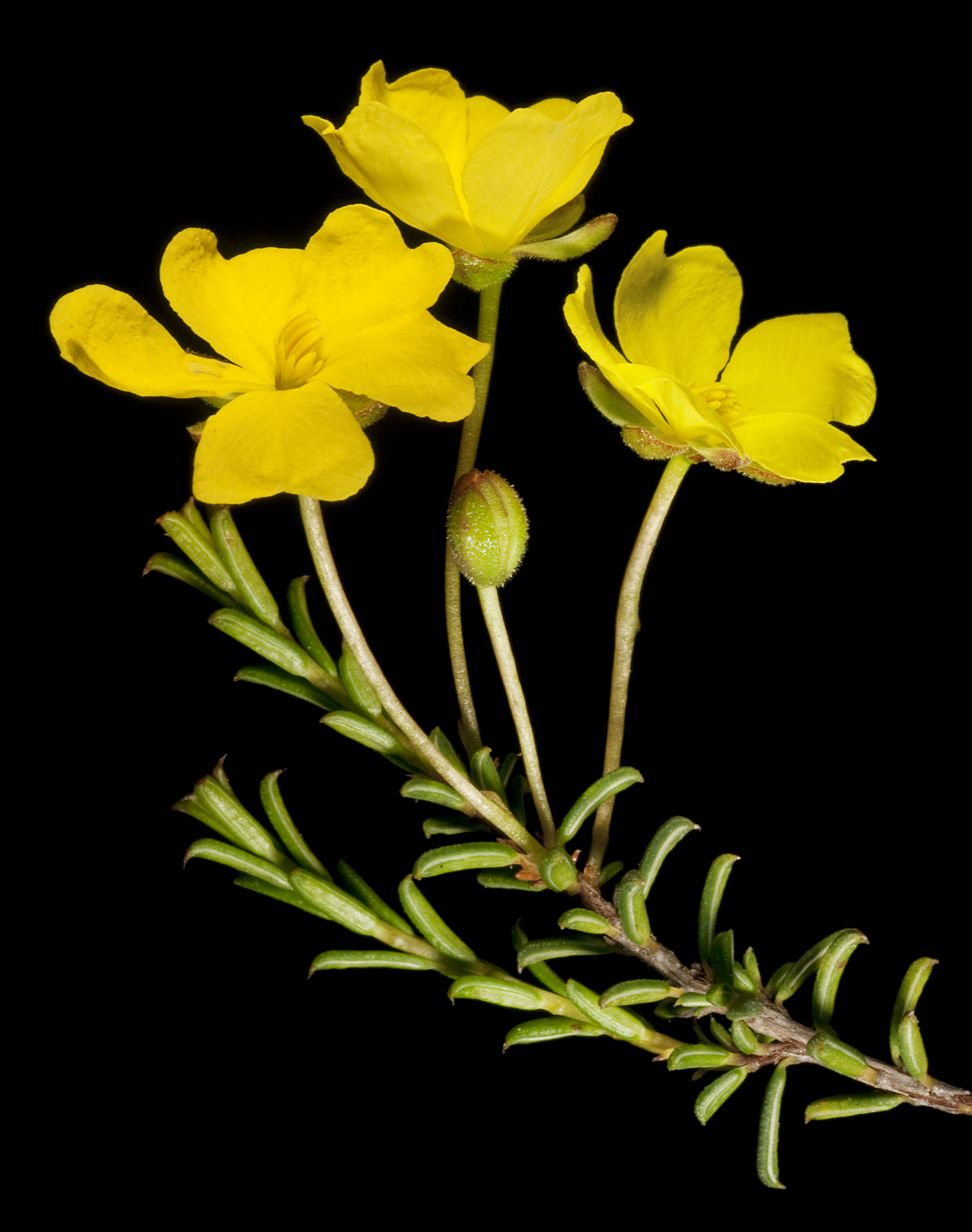

Scientific classification
- Kingdom: Plantae
- Clade: Tracheophytes
- Clade: Angiosperms
- Clade: Eudicots
- Order: Dilleniales
- Family: Dilleniaceae
- Genus: Hibbertia
- Species: H. lineata

Binomial name
- Hibbertia lineata Steud.

= Hibbertia lineata =

Species of flowering plant

Hibbertia lineata is a species of flowering plant in the family Dilleniaceae and is endemic to the south-west of Western Australia. It is a spreading to erect shrub with linear to narrow egg-shaped leaves and yellow flowers, usually with ten stamens arranged on one side of, and leaning over the two densely hairy carpels.

== Description ==
Hibbertia lineata is a spreading to erect shrub that typically grows to a height of 30–60 cm (12–24 in) and has its branches covered with star-shaped hairs when young. The leaves are linear to narrow egg-shaped, 5–15 mm (0.20–0.59 in) long and 0.6–1.0 mm (0.024–0.039 in) wide on a petiole 0.2–0.5 mm (0.0079–0.0197 in) long. The edges of the leaves are rolled under, obscuring most of the lower surface and the tip of the leaf often curves downwards. The flowers are arranged singly in upper leaf axils on a pedicel 5–20 mm (0.20–0.79 in) long with bracts 2–4 mm (0.079–0.157 in) long at the base of the sepals. The five sepals are joined at the base, egg-shaped and 5–6 mm (0.20–0.24 in) long, the inner sepals slightly wider than the inner sepals. The five petals are yellow, egg-shaped with the narrower end towards the base and 5.5–9 mm (0.22–0.35 in) long with a shallow notch at the tip. There are usually ten stamens, arranged in a single group on one side of, and leaning over the two densely softly-hairy carpels that each contain a two ovules.

== Taxonomy ==
Hibbertia lineata was first formally described in 1845 Ernst Gottlieb von Steudel in Johann Georg Christian Lehmann's Plantae Preissianae. The specific epithet (lineata) means "marked with straight lines", referring to the leaves.

== Distribution and habitat ==
This hibbertia grows in kwongan and heath, mainly between Wagin and the Dragon Rocks Nature Reserve, but it is also widely in the Avon Wheatbelt Esperance Plains, Jarrah Forest and Mallee biogeographic regions in the south-west of Western Australia.

== Conservation status ==
Hibbertia lineata is classified as "not threatened" by the Western Australian Government Department of Parks and Wildlife.

== See also ==
- List of Hibbertia species
