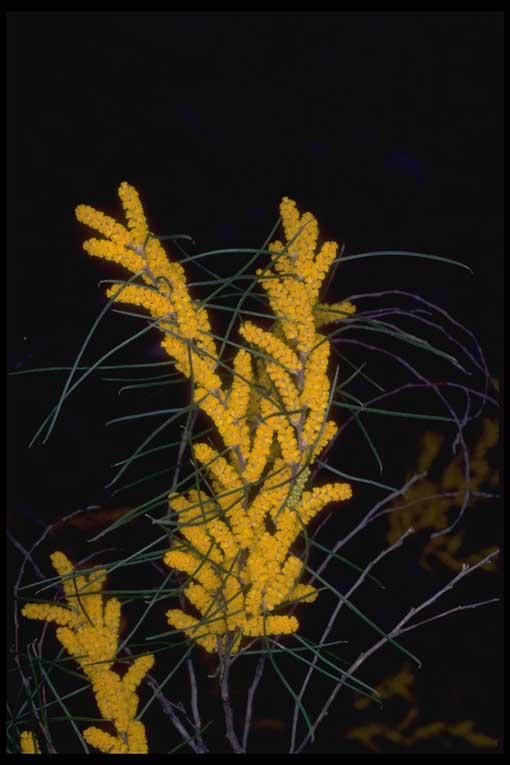
- In the Australian National Botanic Gardens

Scientific classification
- Kingdom: Plantae
- Clade: Tracheophytes
- Clade: Angiosperms
- Clade: Eudicots
- Clade: Rosids
- Order: Fabales
- Family: Fabaceae
- Subfamily: Caesalpinioideae
- Clade: Mimosoid clade
- Genus: Acacia
- Species: A. ephedroides

Binomial name
- Acacia ephedroides Benth.
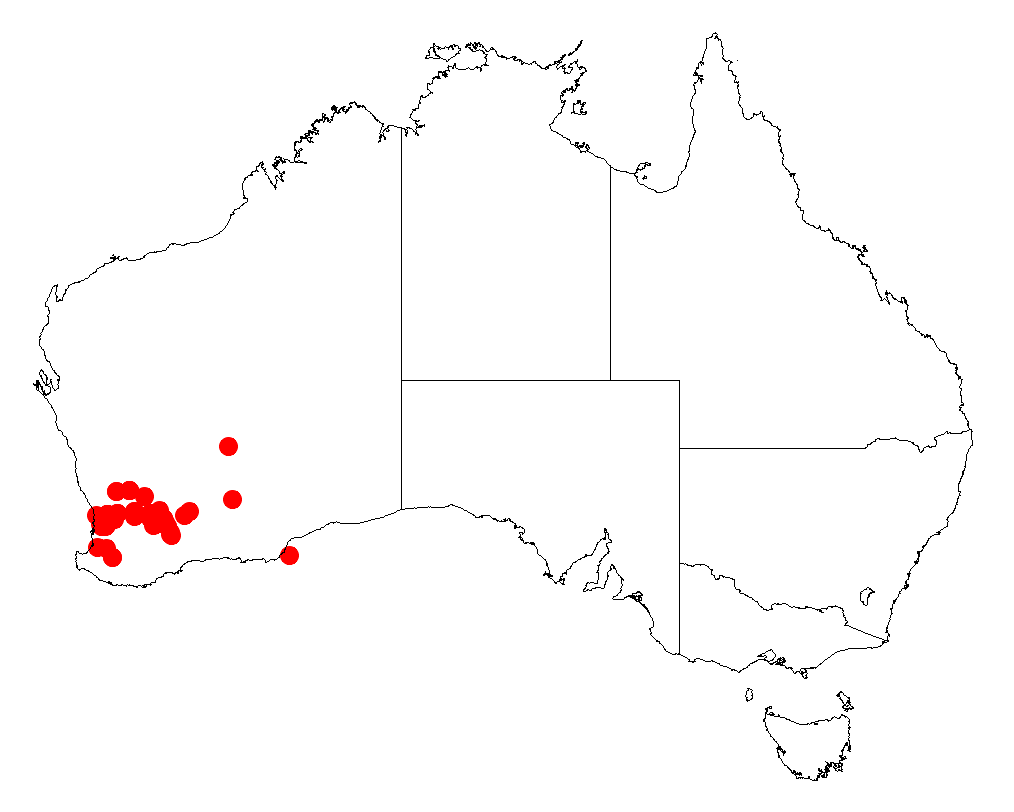
- Occurrence data from AVH

Synonyms
- Racosperma ephedroides (Benth.) Pedley

= Acacia ephedroides =

Species of legume

Acacia ephedroides is a species of flowering plant in the family Fabaceae and is endemic to the south-west of Western Australia. It is a shrub or tree with minni ritchi bark, threadlike phyllodes, more or less spherical to short-cylindrical heads of golden yellow flowers, and linear, leathery pods.

== Description ==
Acacia ephedroides is a weeping shrub or tree that typically grows to a height of 1–4 m (3 ft 3 in – 13 ft 1 in) high and has peeling, minni ritchi bark. Its branchlets are covered with soft hairs pressed against the surface. Its phyllodes are thread-like, straight to slightly curved and compressed to terete, 60–160 mm (2.4–6.3 in) long and 0.7–1 mm (0.028–0.039 in) in diameter. The phyllodes are covered with soft hairs pressed against the surface with 8 prominent veins separated by deep furrows. The flowers are borne in usually two, more or less spherical to short-cylindrical heads in axils, on a densely hairy peduncle up to 0.5 mm (0.020 in) long. Each head is 5–15 mm (0.20–0.59 in) long and 5–6 mm (0.20–0.24 in) in diameter with 18 to 42 golden yellow flowers. Flowering occurs from August to October, and the pods are linear, sometimes slightly wavy, up to 80 mm (3.1 in) long, 4 mm (0.16 in) wide and leathery, with velvety white or yellow hairs. The seeds are broadly elliptic to oblong, 3.0–3.5 mm (0.12–0.14 in) long, glossy brown to black with an aril.

== Taxonomy ==
Acacia ephedroides was first formally described in 1842 by George Bentham in Hooker's London Journal of Botany. The specific epithet (ephedroides) means 'Ephedra-like'.

== Distribution and habitat ==
This species of wattle grows on or around granite outcrops in woodland, scrub and shrubland in the Jarrahdale area, near Manmanning and from Bruce Rock and south to Dragon Rocks in the Avon Wheatbelt, Coolgardie, Jarrah Forest and Mallee bioregions of south-western Western Australia.

== Conservation status ==
Acacia ephedroides is listed as "not threratened" by the Government of Western Australia Department of Biodiversity, Conservation and Attractions.

== See also ==
- List of Acacia species
