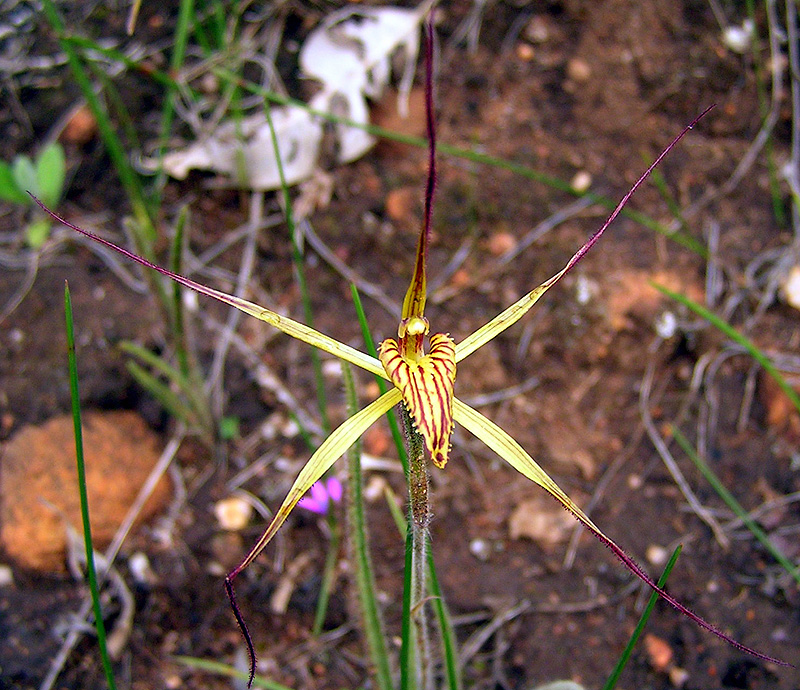

Scientific classification
- Kingdom: Plantae
- Clade: Tracheophytes
- Clade: Angiosperms
- Clade: Monocots
- Order: Asparagales
- Family: Orchidaceae
- Subfamily: Orchidoideae
- Tribe: Diurideae
- Genus: Caladenia
- Species: C. caesarea

Binomial name
- Caladenia caesarea (Domin) M.A.Clem. & Hopper

Synonyms
- Caladenia caesarea D.L.Jones nom. inval.; Caladenia filamentosa var. caesarea Domin; Calonema caesarea Szlach. orth. var.; Calonema caesareum (Domin) D.L.Jones & M.A.Clem.; Calonema caesareum (Domin) Szlach. nom. inval.; Calonemorchis caesarea (Domin) Szlach. nom. superfl.; Jonesiopsis caesarea (Domin) D.L.Jones & M.A.Clem.

= Caladenia caesarea =

Species of orchid

Caladenia caesarea is a species of flowering plant in the orchid family Orchidaceae and is endemic to the south-west of Western Australia. It is a ground orchid with a single erect, hairy leaf and up to three mustard-coloured or lemon-yellow flowers.

== Description ==
Caladenia caesarea is a terrestrial, perennial, deciduous, sympodial herb with a single, erect, hairy leaf 100–180 mm (3.9–7.1 in) long and 2–5 mm (0.079–0.197 in) wide. The plant is 150–350 mm (5.9–13.8 in) high with up to three mustard-coloured or lemon-yellow flowers with a brownish-red labellum, with two rows of glossy yellow calli along its mid-line. The flowers are 50–100 mm (2.0–3.9 in) long and 40–70 mm (1.6–2.8 in) wide.

== Taxonomy and naming ==
This orchid was first formally described in 1912 by Karel Domin who gave it the name Caladenia filamentosa var. caesarea in the Journal of the Linnean Society, Botany from specimens collected by Arthur Dorrien-Smith near Bridgetown in 1909. In 1989, Mark Clements and Stephen Hopper raised the variety to species status as Caladenia caesarea in Australian Orchid Research.

In 2001, Hopper and Andrew Brown described three subspecies of C. caesarea in the journal Nuytsia, and the names are accepted by the Australian Plant Census:

- Caladenia caesarea (Domin) M.A.Clem. & Hopper subsp. caesarea - mustard spider orchid, has a protruding labellum tip, the lateral sepals 45–80 mm (1.8–3.1 in) long and 3.0–4.5 mm (0.12–0.18 in) wide, the petals 45–65 mm (1.8–2.6 in) long and the labellum 12–16 mm (0.47–0.63 in) long and 9–11 mm (0.35–0.43 in) wide.
- Caladenia caesarea subsp. maritima M.A.Clem. & Hopper - cape spider orchid, has a protruding labellum tip, the lateral sepals 23–60 mm (0.91–2.36 in) long and 2.0–2.5 mm (0.079–0.098 in) wide, the petals 25–50 mm (0.98–1.97 in) long and the labellum 10–15 mm (0.39–0.59 in) long and 6–9 mm (0.24–0.35 in) wide.
- Caladenia caesarea subsp. transiens has the labellum evenly curved downwards.

== Distribution and habitat ==
Subspecies caesarea grows in seasonally wet areas between Wagin, Tenterden and Busselton in the Avon Wheatbelt, Jarrah Forest and Mallee bioregions of south-western Western Australia. Subspecies maritima grows on granite and rock outcrops and is restricted to the Leeuwin-Naturaliste National Park and Ludlow areas of the Jarrah Forest bioregion, and subsp. transiens grows in shallow soil in open mallee in disjunct locations in the Jarrah Forest bioregion.
