= Meelup Regional Park =

Regional park in Western Australia

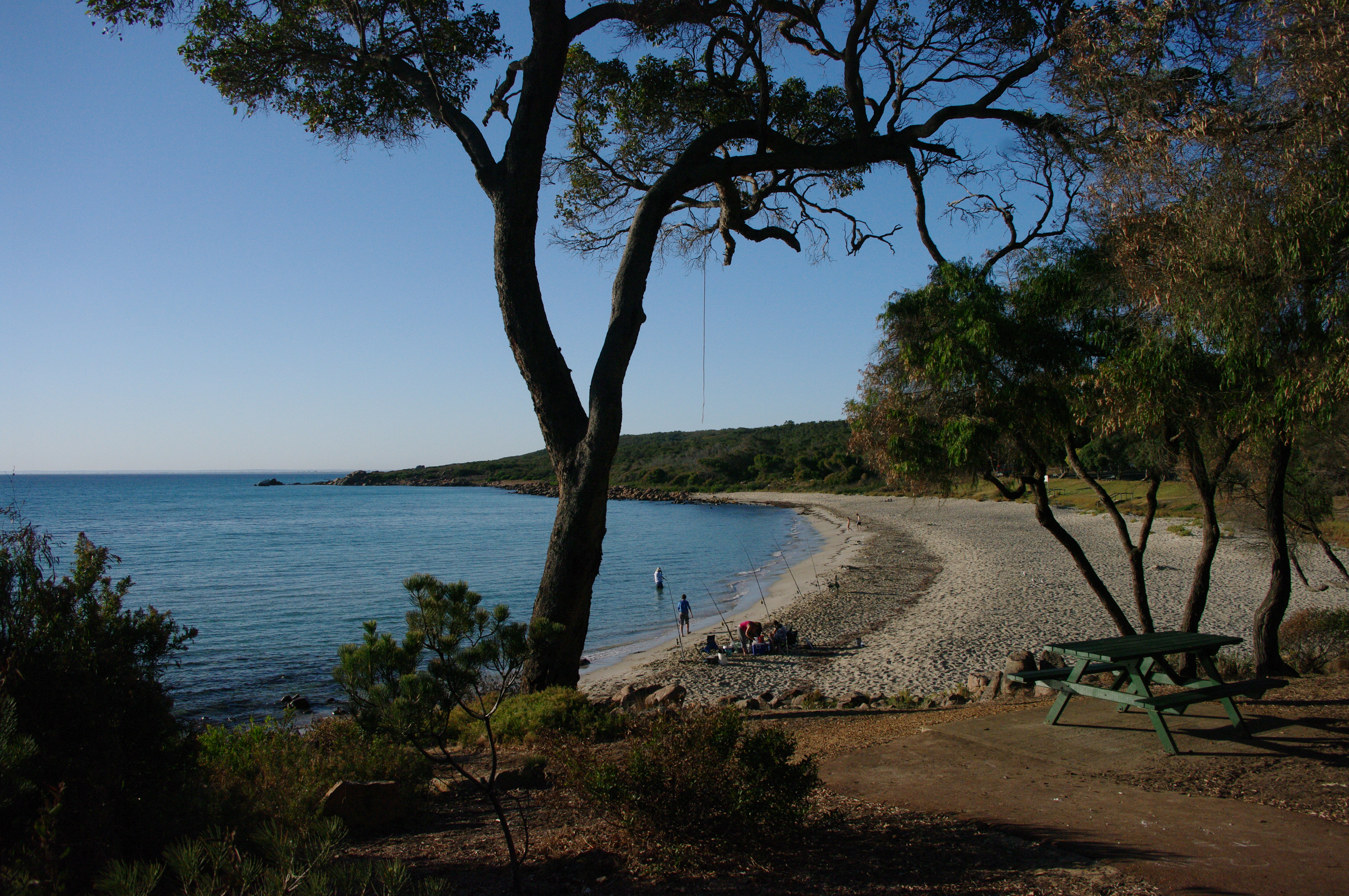
- Meelup Beach
- Interactive map of Meelup Regional Park
- Type: Regional Park
- Location: Dunsborough, Western Australia
- Coordinates: 33°33′S 115°04′E
- Area: 577 ha (1,430 acres)
- Website: meeluppark.com

The Meelup Regional Park is a coastal regional park near the Western Australian town of Dunsborough in the state's South West region. It contains 11.5 kilometres (7.1 mi) of coastline between Dunsborough and Bunker Bay (the latter in the Leeuwin-Naturaliste National Park). It features Meelup Beach and Eagle Bay, with other points of interest being Gannet Rock, Rocky Point, Castle Bay, Curtis Bay, and Point Piquet. It is an A-class reserve managed by the local government area of the City of Busselton in partnership with the Meelup Regional Park Management Committee.

== History ==
The first inhabitants of the area were the indigenous Wardandi subgroup of the Noongar people, who camped in the freshwater lagoon above Meelup Beach and, as they still do today, fished for Australian salmon. The name Meelup is said to mean 'by the location of eyes' in the Wardandi dialect of the Noongar language; it has also been said to mean 'place of the moon rising', because the full moon sometimes appears to rise out of the sea at Meelup Beach. On 30 May 1801, a landing party from the Baudin expedition unsuccessfully looked for water at Eagle Bay; this event is commemorated by the Baudin memorial, which was unveiled in 2001. Castle Bay was used for whaling during the 19th century; the Castle Bay Whaling Company operated locally from 1845 to 1872. There was a commercial salmon fishery in Eagle Bay in the 1950s and camping at Meelup Beach was common and permitted until the 1970s. In the 1980s, development proposals for a fishing harbour at Point Picquet and a power boat marina at Curtis Bay caused great controversy, leading to the formation of the Meelup Regional Park to cover the area. In 1993, it became an A-class reserve vested in the local government area of what was then the Shire of Busselton, managed in partnership with the Meelup Regional Park Management Committee. The park was formed from six existing reserves, with land later being added from nearby lots.

== Features ==
The park has the following points of interest:

- Meelup Beach, the most popular area of the park, notable for its north-east-facing orientation
- Gannet Rock
- Rocky Point
- Castle Bay
- Curtis Bay
- Point Piquet, with a whale-viewing platform
- Eagle bay, with holiday houses at the nearby eponymous locality

The park contains several walking and bicycling trails. Beaches in this area are suitable for swimming in summer. Winter surfing can be undertaken during strong swells from Rocky Point, Point Piquet, and Castle Bay. The dive wreck of HMAS Swan is nearby.

== Flora and fauna ==
Vegetation in the park includes jarrah and marri forests, banksia woodlands, heath, low shrublands, annual herbs, grasses, and orchids. The Meelup mallee (Eucalyptus × phylacis) and cape spider orchid (Caladenia caesarea subsp. maritima) are endemic to the park. Animals of conservation significance in the park include the southern brown bandicoot, Carnaby's black cockatoo, Baudin's black cockatoo, the red-tailed black cockatoo, the rainbow bee-eater, the Caspian tern, the western false pipistrelle bat, and the western ringtail possum. Problems are caused by feral animals such as cats, rabbits and foxes, plants such as the bridal creeper, arum lily, one-leaf Cape tulip, and Sydney golden wattle, and dieback caused by Phytophthora cinnamomi.
