= Eucalyptus virginea =

Conservation status
- Vulnerable (IUCN 3.1)

- Priority Four — Rare Taxa (DEC)

Scientific classification
- Kingdom: Plantae
- Clade: Tracheophytes
- Clade: Angiosperms
- Clade: Eudicots
- Clade: Rosids
- Order: Myrtales
- Family: Myrtaceae
- Genus: Eucalyptus
- Species: E. virginea

Binomial name
- Eucalyptus virginea Hopper & Ward.-Johnson

Species of eucalyptus

Eucalyptus virginea is a species of tree that is endemic to the south coast of Western Australia. It has smooth bark, narrow lance-shaped to curved adult leaves, flower buds in groups of seven, white flowers and cup-shaped fruit.

== Description ==
Eucalyptus virginea is a tree that typically grows to a height of 20 m (66 ft) and forms a lignotuber. It has smooth pale grey bark, sometimes with insect scribbles. Adult leaves are arranged alternately, thin, glossy green, paler on the lower surface, narrow lance-shaped, 70–100 mm (2.8–3.9 in) long and 13–25 mm (0.51–0.98 in) wide, tapering to a petiole 8–15 mm (0.31–0.59 in) long. The flower buds are arranged in leaf axils on an unbranched peduncle 5–15 mm (0.20–0.59 in) long, the individual buds on pedicels 2–6 mm (0.079–0.236 in) long. Mature buds are spherical to diamond-shaped, 6–8 mm (0.24–0.31 in) long and 5–6 mm (0.20–0.24 in) wide with a rounded to conical operculum. Flowering occurs from December or January to July and the flowers are white. The fruit is a woody cup-shaped capsule 4–6 mm (0.16–0.24 in) long and 7–12 mm (0.28–0.47 in) wide with the valves protruding above the rim.

== Taxonomy and naming ==
Eucalyptus virginea was first formally described in 2004 by Stephen Hopper and Greg Wardell-Johnson in the journal Nuytsia from specimens collected in the Mount Lindesay National Park (now part of the Mount Barney National Park) in 1993. The specific epithet (virginea) is from the Latin word virgineus meaning "pure white", referring to the white bark, but also to the forester Barney White.

== Distribution and habitat ==
This eucalypt grows in the transition zone between creek lines where karri (Eucalyptus diversicolor) dominates, and drier uplands where marri (Corymbia calophylla) and jarrah (Eucalyptus marginata) dominate. It occurs in the Mount Lindesay area, north of Denmark.

== Conservation status ==
This species is classified as "Priority Four" by the Government of Western Australia Department of Parks and Wildlife, meaning that is rare or near threatened. The IUCN Red List assesses the species as Vulnerable.

== See also ==
- List of Eucalyptus species
