= Eagle Bay, Western Australia =

Town in Western Australia

Eagle Bay
- Town
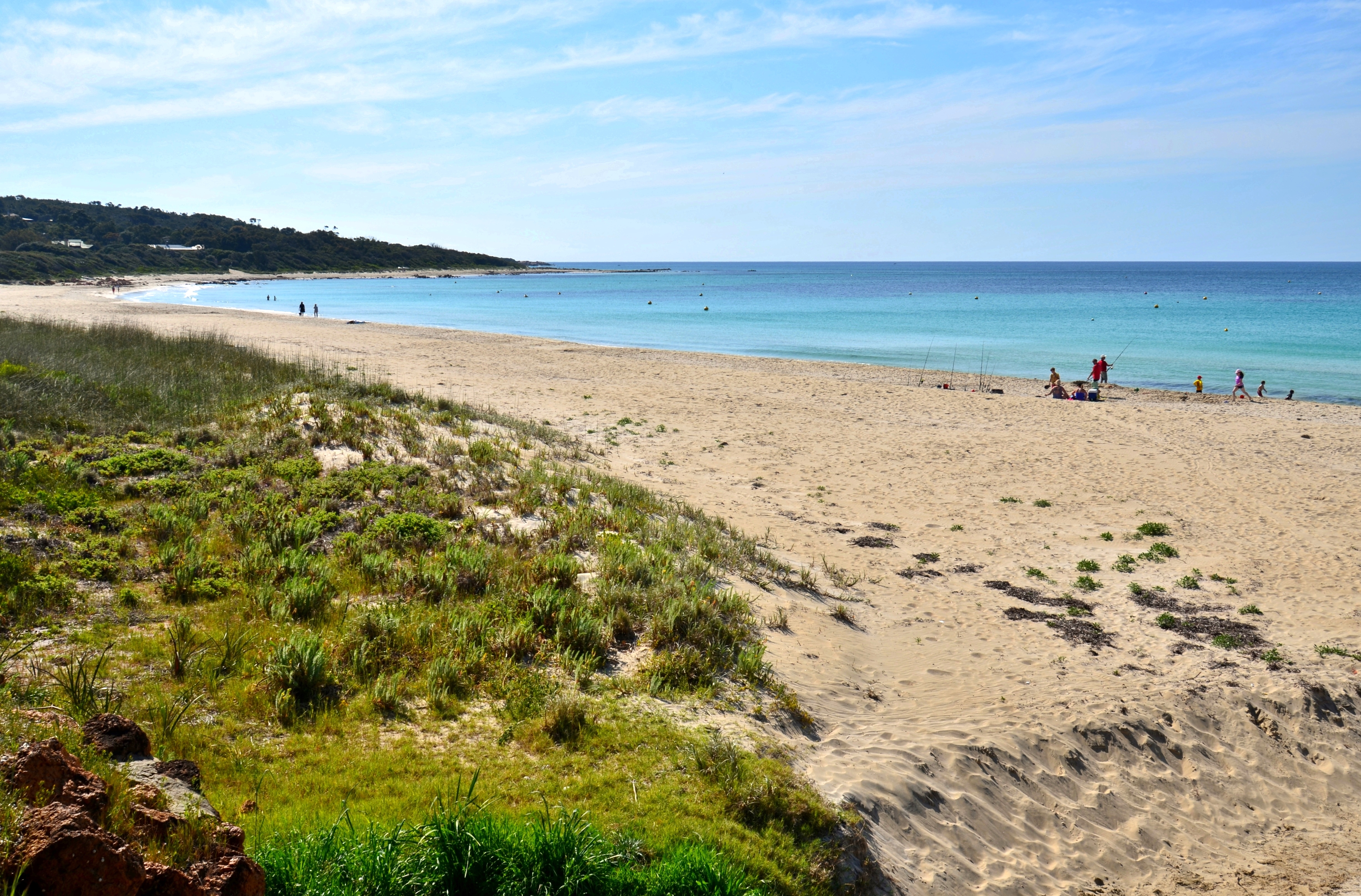
- Eagle Bay

- Interactive map of Eagle Bay
- Coordinates: 33°33′39″S 115°03′48″E
- Country: Australia
- State: Western Australia
- LGA: City of Busselton
- Location: 257 km (160 mi) from Perth; 32 km (20 mi) from Busselton; 8 km (5.0 mi) from Dunsborough

Government
  - State electorate: Vasse
  - Federal division: Forrest

Area
  - Total: 1.9 km^{2} (0.73 sq mi)

Population
  - Total: 120 (SAL 2021)
- Time zone: UTC+8 (AWST)
- Postcode: 6281

Eagle Bay is a small town in Western Australia's South West region near Dunsborough, in the local government area of the City of Busselton. At the 2021 census, it had a population of 120. It is known for its luxury holiday homes, with an occupancy rate on the night of the 2021 census of about 13%.

On 30 May 1801, a landing party from the Baudin expedition unsuccessfully looked for water at Eagle Bay; this event is commemorated by the Baudin memorial, which was unveiled in 2001. In the late 19th century Stewart Keenan, who had a farm in the local area, built a track connecting his Eagle Bay farm to the timber mill community at Yelverton. In the 1950s, there was a commercial salmon fishery in Eagle Bay. The modern-day settlement began to develop in the early 1970s. Eagle Bay contains a residents' association (established 1990), a volunteer fire brigade, and a community hall (constructed in 2014). The eponymous bay is in Meelup Regional Park.
