= Lake Hurlstone Nature Reserve =

Nature reserve in Western Australia

- IUCN category Ia (strict nature reserve)
- Interactive map of Lake Hurlstone Nature Reserve
- Location: Wheatbelt, Western Australia
- Nearest city: Holt Rock
- Coordinates: 32.59409733°S 119.38619359°E
- Area: 48.56 km^{2} (18.75 sq mi)
- Established: 1969

Lake Hurlstone Nature Reserve is a nature reserve near the edge of Holt Rock and includes Lake Hurlstone. Located in the Wheatbelt region of Western Australia, it is about 55 kilometres (34 mi) east-south-east of Hyden. It covers 48.56 square kilometres (18.75 sq mi), was gazetted in 1969 and is classed as a strict nature reserve, IUCN category Ia.

The reserve is made up of several Crown reserves set aside for the conservation of flora and fauna and vested in the Western Australian Wildlife Authority.

A regional assessment prepared for the Australian Heritage Commission in 2000 found that the Lake Hurlstone reserve system was one of ten areas of remnant vegetation in the Central Wheatbelt that met the threshold for three of the criteria used for the Register of the National Estate. It was listed on the Western Australian Register of the National Estate on 24 September 2002.
