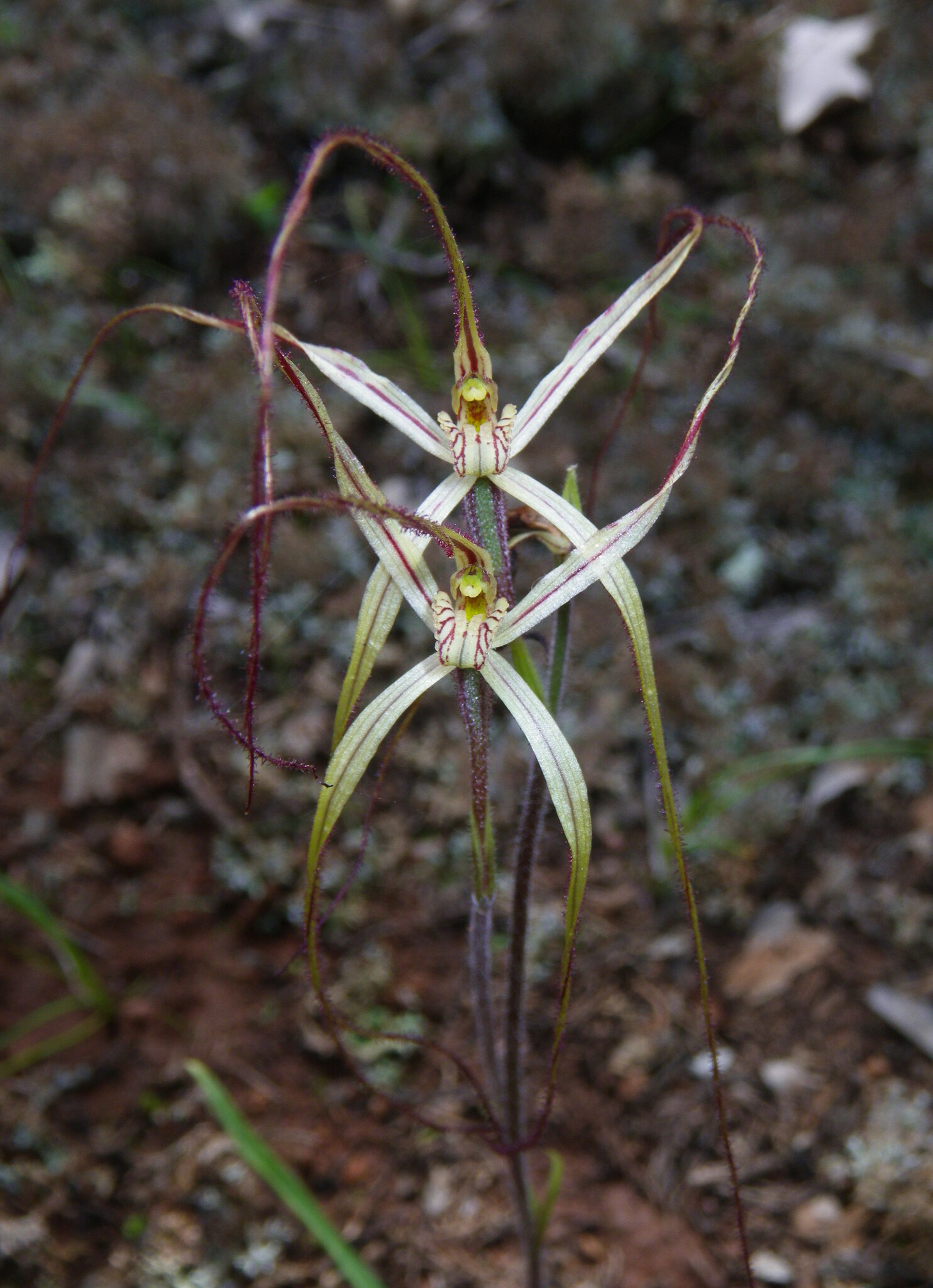
- West of Temora, New South Wales

Scientific classification
- Kingdom: Plantae
- Clade: Embryophytes
- Clade: Tracheophytes
- Clade: Spermatophytes
- Clade: Angiosperms
- Clade: Monocots
- Order: Asparagales
- Family: Orchidaceae
- Subfamily: Orchidoideae
- Tribe: Diurideae
- Genus: Caladenia
- Species: C. flaccida

Binomial name
- Caladenia flaccida D.L.Jones

Synonyms
- Calonema flaccidum (D.L.Jones) D.L.Jones & M.A.Clem.; Calonema flaccidum (D.L.Jones) Szlach.; Calonemorchis flaccida (D.L.Jones) Szlach.; Jonesiopsis flaccida (D.L.Jones) D.L.Jones & M.A.Clem.

= Caladenia flaccida =

Flaccid spider orchid

Species of orchid

Caladenia flaccida, commonly known as the flaccid spider orchid, is a plant in the orchid family Orchidaceae and is endemic to eastern Australia. It is a ground orchid with a single hairy leaf and up to three cream-coloured, pinkish or red flowers with long, thread-like, glandular tips on the sepals and petals.

== Description ==
Caladenia flaccida is a terrestrial, perennial, deciduous, herb with an underground tuber and a single, dull green, densely hairy, linear leaf 120–180 mm (5–7 in) long and 4–6 mm (0.16–0.24 in) wide. Up to three cream-coloured, pinkish or red flowers are borne on a thin, wiry spike 120–230 mm (5–9 in) high. The sepals and petals are linear in shape near their base but suddenly taper after about one-fifth of their length to a hairy, thread-like glandular tail. The dorsal sepal is 60–90 mm (2–4 in) long, about 2 mm (0.08 in) wide near the base. The lateral sepals are a similar size and shape to the dorsal sepal and the petals are slightly shorter. The labellum is narrow heart-shaped, about 7–10 mm (0.3–0.4 in) long and 5.5–6.5 mm (0.2–0.3 in) wide and cream-coloured with red markings or completely red. The labellum curves forward and has broad, white-tipped teeth on the sides and two rows of crowded, cream-coloured, stalked calli along its mid-line, decreasing in size towards the tip. Flowering occurs from August to October.

== Taxonomy and naming ==
Caladenia flaccida was first formally described by David Jones in 1991 and the description was published in Australian Orchid Research. The specific epithet (flaccida) is a Latin word meaning "weak" or "drooping", referring to the drooping sepals and petals.

== Distribution and habitat ==
Flaccid spider orchid grows on ridges and slopes in Callitris forest in Queensland, New South Wales, South Australia and possibly Victoria.
