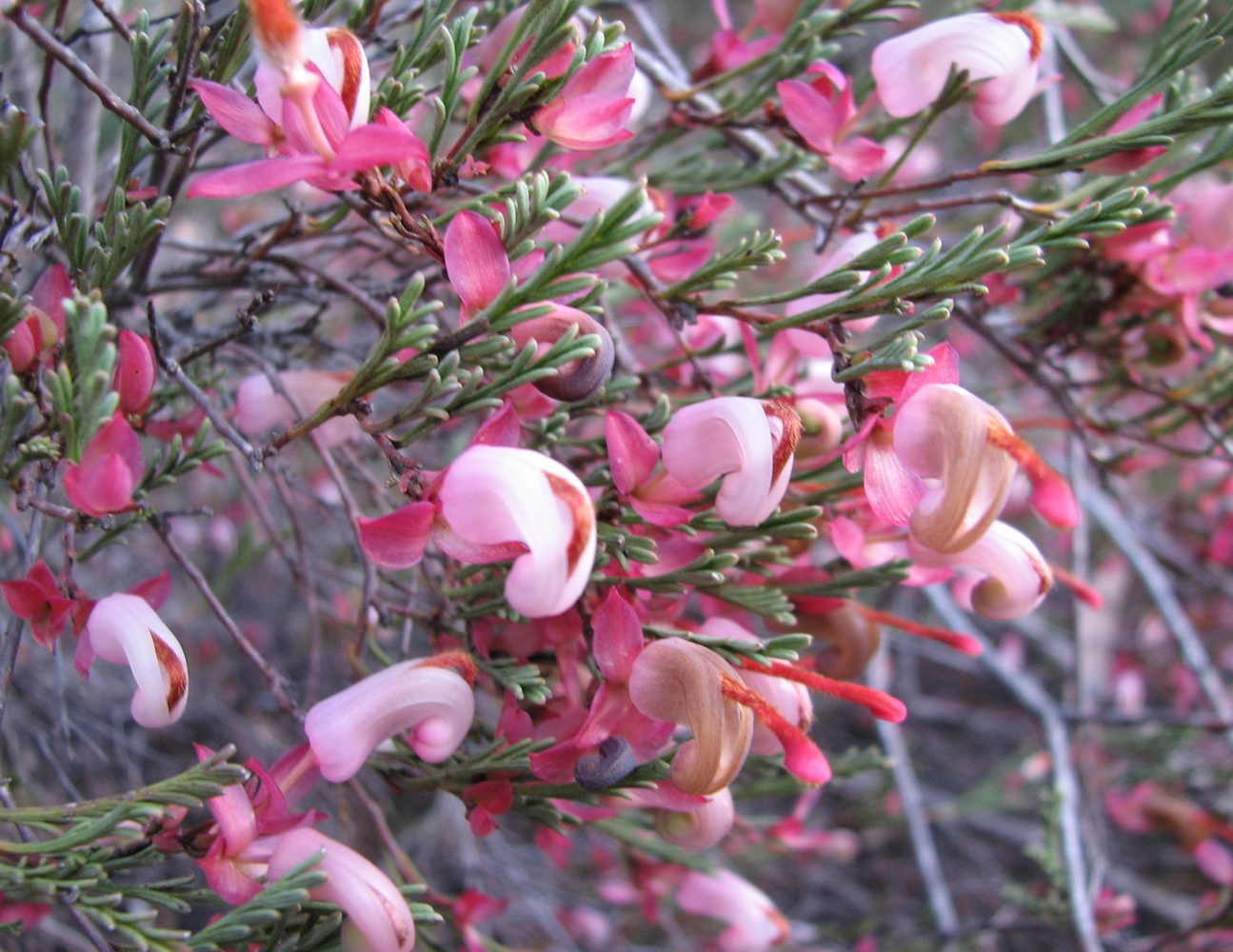
- In Maranoa Gardens

Conservation status
- Critically Endangered (IUCN 3.1)

- Declared rare (DEC)

Scientific classification
- Kingdom: Plantae
- Clade: Embryophytes
- Clade: Tracheophytes
- Clade: Angiosperms
- Clade: Eudicots
- Order: Proteales
- Family: Proteaceae
- Genus: Grevillea
- Species: G. involucrata

Binomial name
- Grevillea involucrata A.S.George

= Grevillea involucrata =

Lake Varley grevillea

Species of shrub endemic to Western Australia

Grevillea involucrata, also known as Lake Varley grevillea, is a species of flowering plant in the family Proteaceae and is endemic to the south-west of Western Australia. It is an openly-branched, prostrate or low-lying shrub with divided leaves with parallel, oblong to linear lobes, and pink flowers with a pinkish-red style.

== Description ==
Grevillea involucrata is an openly-branched, prostrate to low-lying shrub that typically grows to a height of 15–50 cm (5.9–19.7 in) and up to 2 m (6 ft 7 in) wide. Its leaves are 15–40 mm (0.59–1.57 in) long, 6–10 mm (0.24–0.39 in) wide and divided with parallel oblong to linear lobes 1–8 mm (0.039–0.315 in) long and 0.8–1.2 mm (0.031–0.047 in) wide. The edges of the leaflets are rolled under, enclosing most of the lower surface. The flowers are arranged singly, in pairs or threes in leaf axils or on the ends of branches on a rachis 0.5–1 mm (0.020–0.039 in) long, the pistil 23–25 mm (0.91–0.98 in) long. The flowers are pale to dark pink with a reddish-pink style. Flowering occurs from June to October and the fruit is a hairy, oblong to elliptic follicle 13–15 mm (0.51–0.59 in) long.

== Taxonomy ==
Grevillea involucrata was first formally described in 1974 by botanist Alex George in the journal Nuytsia, based on plant material he collected between Hyden and Lake Varley in 1970. The specific epithet (involucrata) means "having leaves or bracts surrounding the base of the flowers".

== Distribution and habitat ==
Lake Varley grevillea grows in low, open shrubland in scattered locations between Lake Grace, Hyden, Holt Rock and Lake Magenta in the Mallee bioregion of south-western Western Australia.

== Conservation status ==
Grevillea involulacrata is listed as 'Threatened' by the Western Australian Government Department of Biodiversity, Conservation and Attractions, meaning that it is in danger of extinction, and as 'Critically Endangered' by the IUCN Red List.
