= Dragon Rocks Nature Reserve =

Nature reserve in Western Australia

- IUCN category Ia (strict nature reserve)
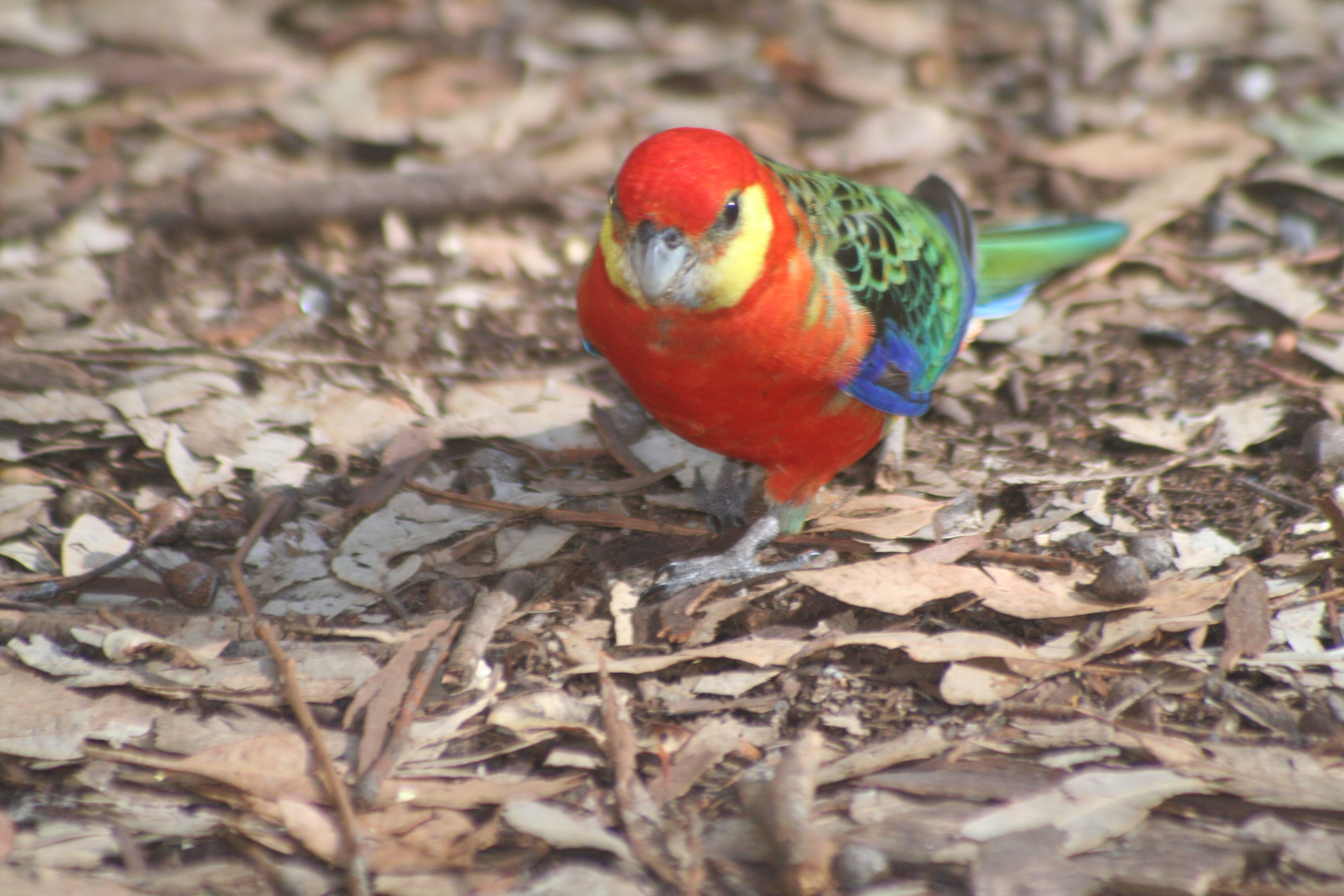
- The reserve is an important site for the western rosella

- Location within Western Australia
- Location: Western Australia
- Nearest city: Hyden
- Coordinates: 32°45′00″S 119°02′15″E
- Area: 32,195 ha (124.31 sq mi)
- Established: 1979
- Governing body: Department of Biodiversity, Conservation and Attractions

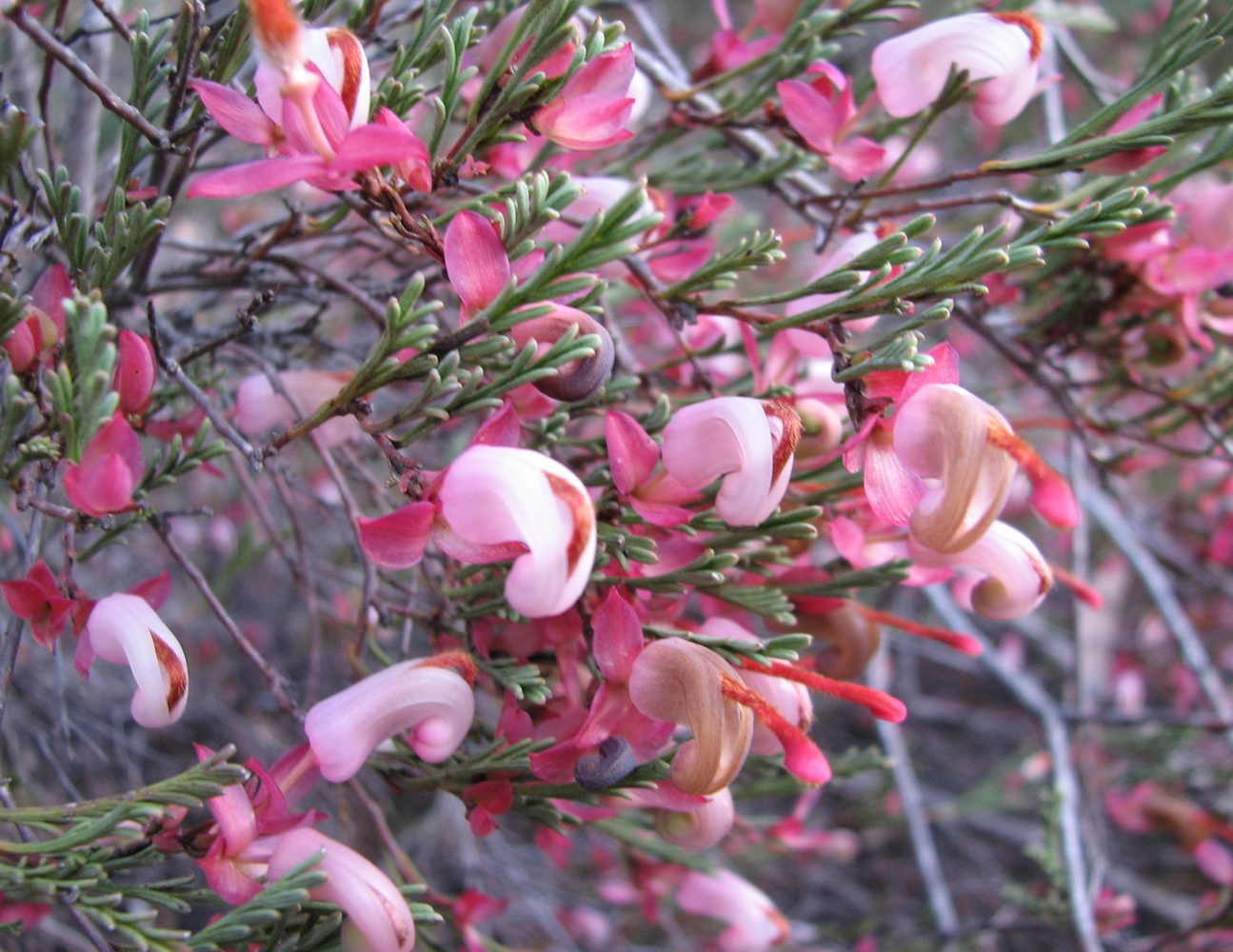
The Lake Varley grevillea is found in the reserve

Dragon Rocks is a 322 km^{2} nature reserve in the south-east of the Wheatbelt region of Western Australia, some 310 km east-south-east of Perth. It is surrounded by farmland. It is listed on Australia's Register of the National Estate as an area significant for rare species of plants and animals.

== Flora and fauna ==
The reserve contains 28 different vegetation associations, including heaths, woodlands, low forests, mallee and kwongan. A large number of plant communities form a complex mosaic characteristic of wheatbelt vegetation, including vegetation communities occurring on laterite. 16 plant species, including 13 eucalypts, are endemic to the Wheatbelt region of Western Australia. The rare Lake Varley grevillea is found in the reserve.

Frog species in the reserve include Günther's toadlet and the spotted-thighed frog. Reptiles present include at least three legless lizards and three geckos. The honey possum, Gilbert's dunnart, and the red-tailed phascogale are also present.

The reserve has been identified as an Important Bird Area because it supports populations of the endangered Carnaby's black-cockatoo, malleefowl, western rosella, blue-breasted fairy-wren, purple-gaped honeyeater, and western yellow robin.
