= Oxalis furcata =

Oxalis furcata can refer to:

- Oxalis furcata Elliott, a synonym of Oxalis corniculata L.
- Oxalis furcata (Rose) Rose ex R.Knuth, a synonym of Oxalis decaphylla Kunth
