= Oxalis pubescens =

Oxalis pubescens is a botanical synonym of two species of plant:

- Oxalis corniculata, widespread species the synonym published in 1812
- Oxalis laxa, a species from South America the synonym published in 1841
