= Oxalis micrantha =

Oxalis micrantha is a botanical synonym of two species of plant:

- Oxalis corniculata, widespread species the synonym published in 1877 by Wenceslas Bojer and August Progel
- Oxalis laxa, a species from South America the synonym published in 1829 by Carlo Giuseppe Bertero
