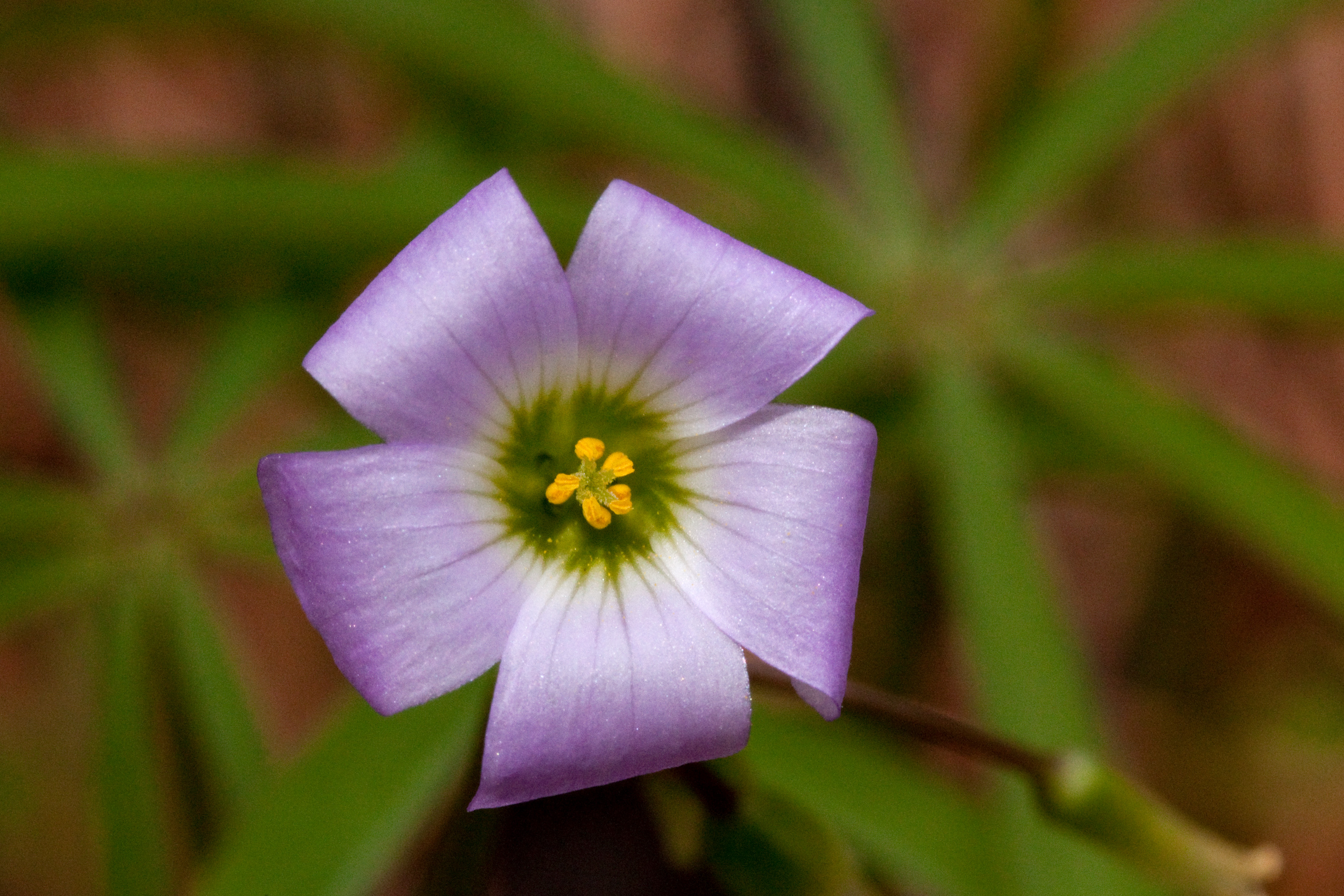
- Flower
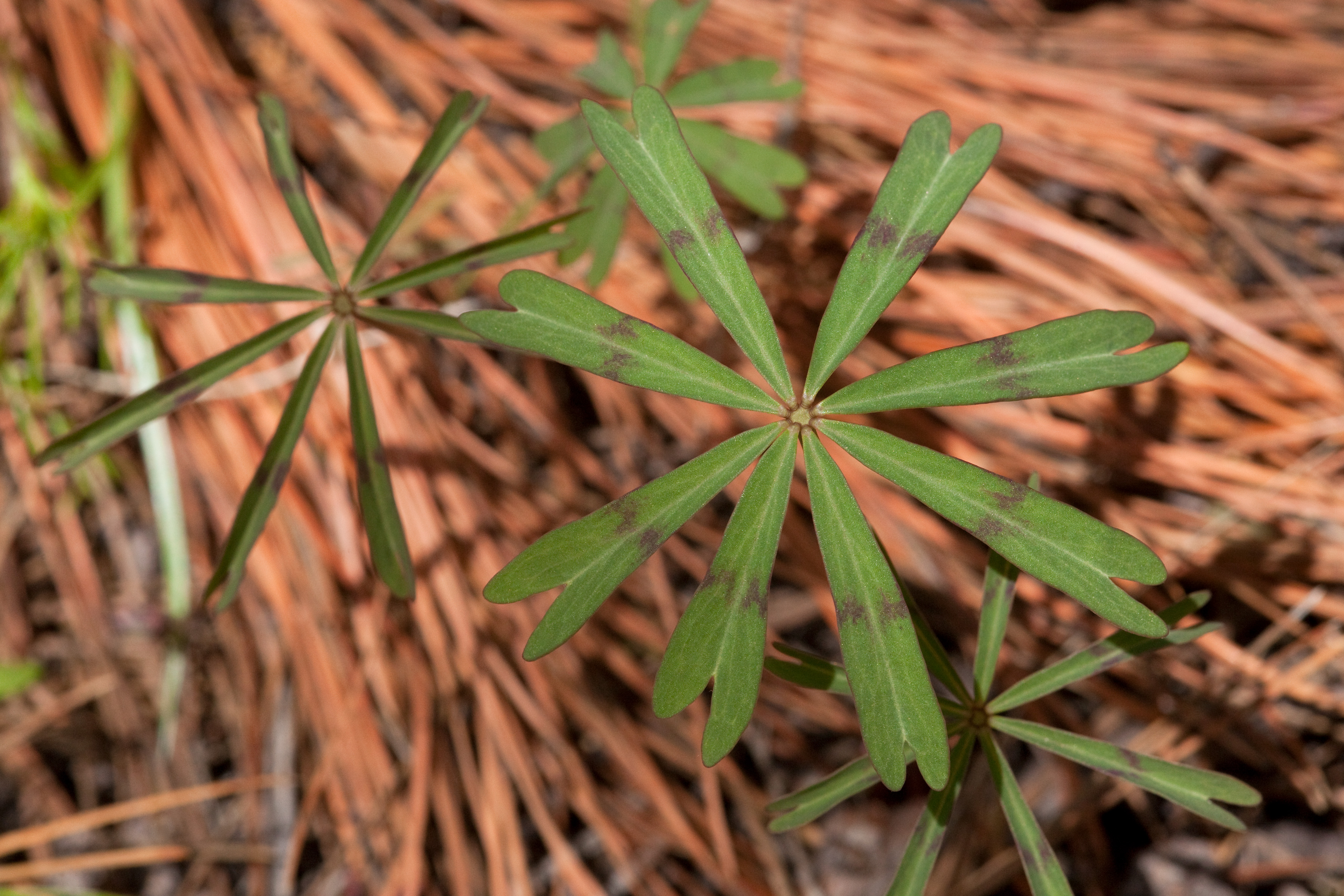
- Leaves

Scientific classification
- Kingdom: Plantae
- Clade: Tracheophytes
- Clade: Angiosperms
- Clade: Eudicots
- Clade: Rosids
- Order: Oxalidales
- Family: Oxalidaceae
- Genus: Oxalis
- Species: O. decaphylla

Binomial name
- Oxalis decaphylla Kunth

Synonyms
- List: Acetosella decaphylla (Kunth) Kuntze; Ionoxalis confusa Rose; Ionoxalis decaphylla Rose; Ionoxalis furcata Rose; Ionoxalis grayi Rose; Ionoxalis jaliscana Rose; Ionoxalis occidentalis Rose; Ionoxalis painteri Rose ex Small; Oxalis confusa (Rose) R.Knuth; Oxalis furcata (Rose) Rose ex R.Knuth; Oxalis grayi (Rose) R.Knuth; Oxalis jaliscana (Rose) Rose ex R.Knuth; Oxalis painteri (Rose ex Small) R.Knuth; Oxalis zacatecasensis R.Knuth

= Oxalis decaphylla =

Species of plant

Oxalis decaphylla, the ten-leaf woodsorrel, is a species of flowering plant in the family Oxalidaceae. It is native to Arizona, New Mexico, and Mexico, and it has been introduced to Great Britain. A perennial reaching 45 cm (18 in), it is found in a wide variety of damp habitats in otherwise drier areas.

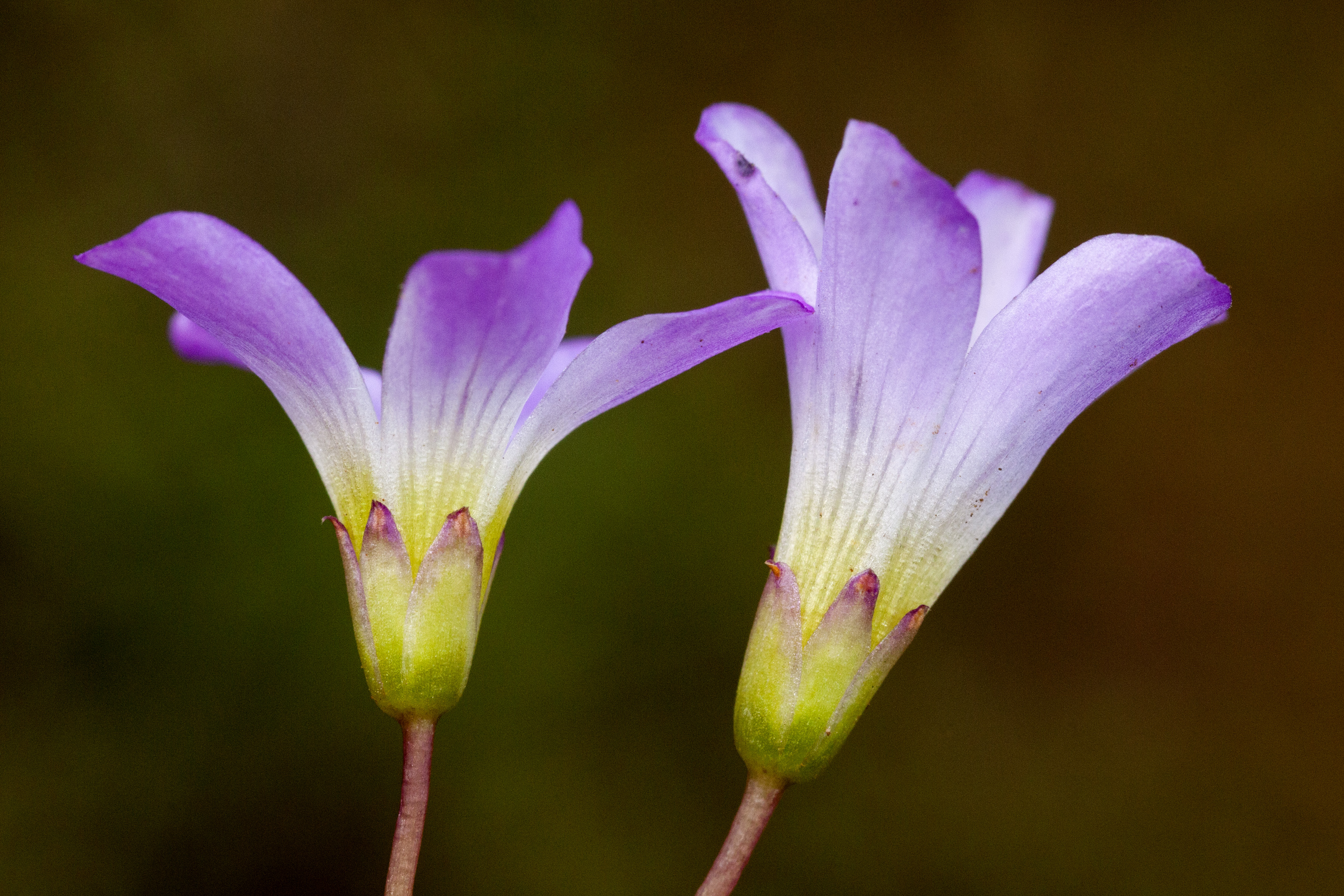
Side view of flowers

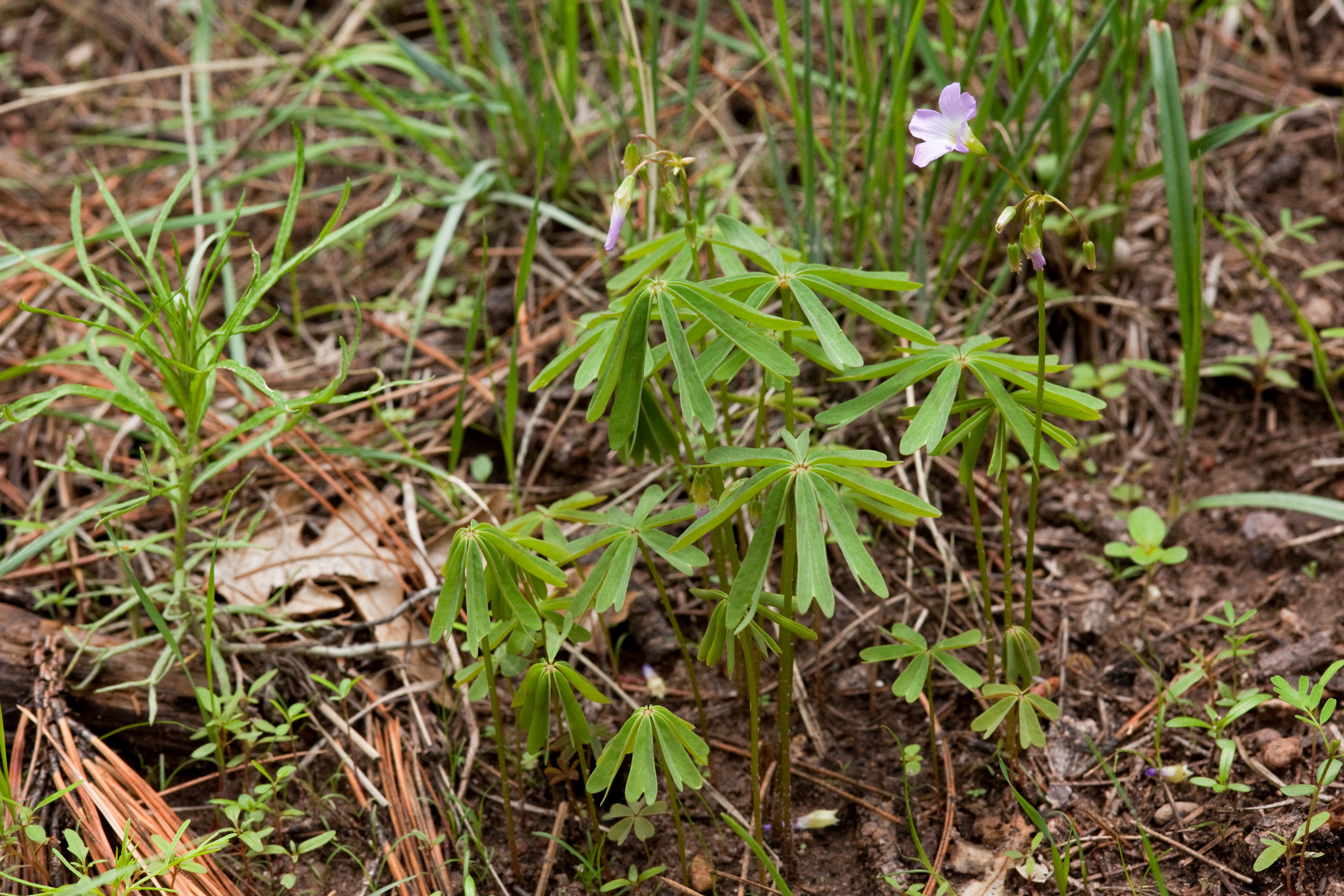
Habit
