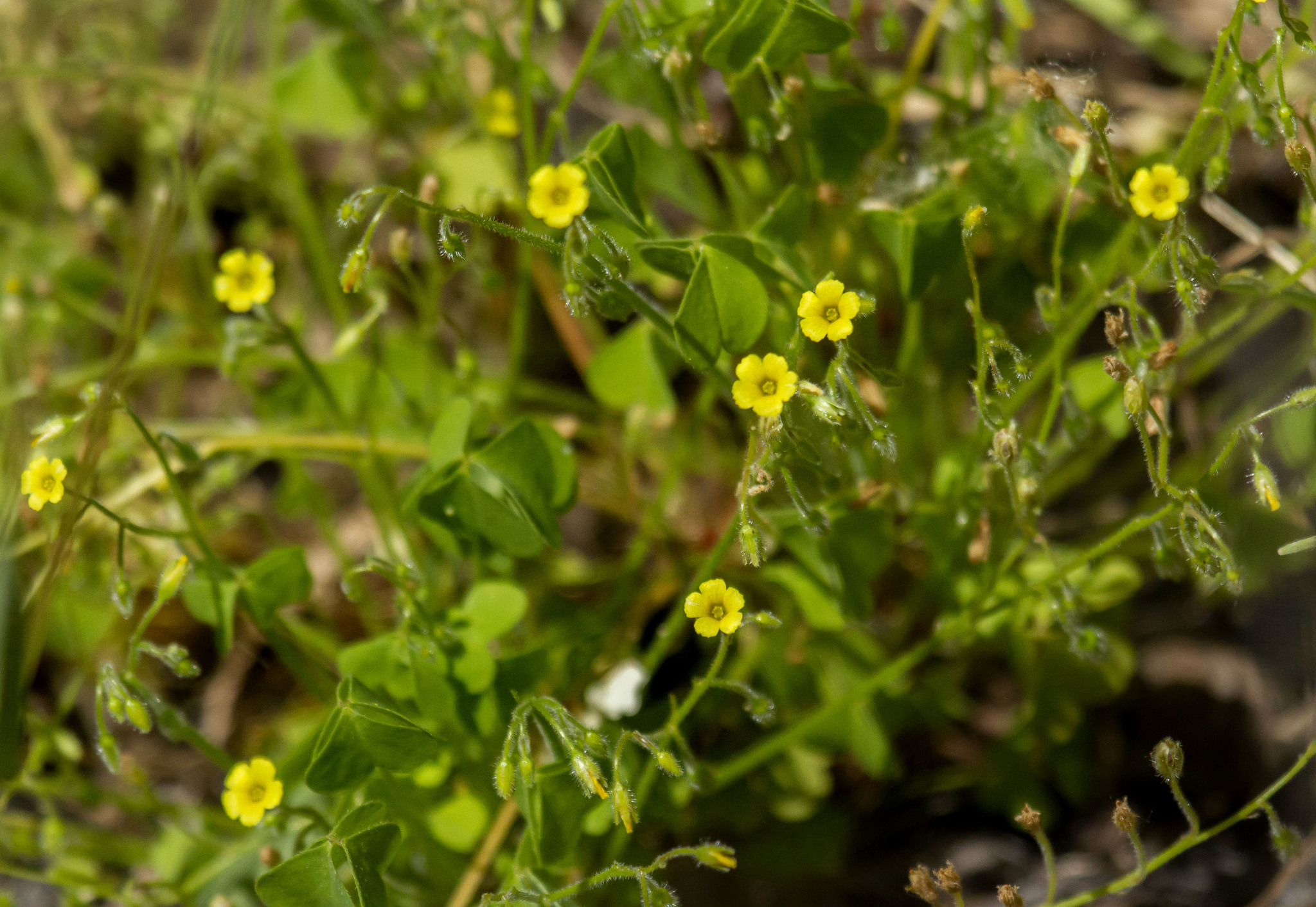
- In Madera County, California

Scientific classification
- Kingdom: Plantae
- Clade: Tracheophytes
- Clade: Angiosperms
- Clade: Eudicots
- Clade: Rosids
- Order: Oxalidales
- Family: Oxalidaceae
- Genus: Oxalis
- Species: O. laxa

Binomial name
- Oxalis laxa Hook. & Arn.

Synonyms
- Acetosella laxa; Xanthoxalis laxa

= Oxalis laxa =

Plant species in the wood-sorrel family

Oxalis laxa, commonly called dwarf woodsorrel, is a species of flowering plant from South America in the wood-sorrel family. It is an introduced weed in California.

== Description ==
Dwarf woodsorrel is an annual plant with fibrous roots. Its stems grow upwards to as much as 20 centimeters. It has leaves growing both from the base of the plant and attached to its stems by leaf stems as much as 5 cm long. Its leaves are divided into leaflets that are sparely hairy and about 1.3 cm long.

Its flowers have yellow, oblong petals less than 1.2 cm long. The fruit is an egg-shaped capsule to about 5 mm.

== Taxonomy ==
Oxalis laxa was scientifically described and named by William Jackson Hooker and George Arnott Walker Arnott in 1830. It is classified in the genus Oxalis as part of the family Oxalidaceae. It has no accepted varieties, but has four in its 40 synonyms.

Table of Synonyms
Name	Year	Rank	Notes
Acetosella alsinoides (Walp.) Kuntze	1891	species	= het.
Acetosella brevicaulis (Steud.) Kuntze	1891	species	= het., not validly publ.
Acetosella cumingii (Herb.) Kuntze	1891	species	= het.
Acetosella dichotomiflora (Steud.) Kuntze	1891	species	= het.
Acetosella laxa (Hook. & Arn.) Kuntze	1891	species	≡ hom.
Acetosella micrantha (Bertero) Kuntze	1891	species	= het.
Acetosella platycaulis (Steud.) Kuntze	1891	species	= het.
Acetosella puberula Kuntze	1891	species	= het.
Acetosella pygmaea Kuntze	1891	species	= het.
Acetosella vinaquillo (Steud.) Kuntze	1891	species	= het.
Oxalis adenocaulos Phil.	1893	species	= het.
Oxalis alsinoides Walp.	1843	species	= het.
Oxalis brevicaulis Steud.	1841	species	= het., nom. nud.
Oxalis campanensis Lourteig	2000	species	= het.
Oxalis chosicensis R.Knuth	1919	species	= het.
Oxalis corniculata var. sericea R.Knuth	1919	variety	= het.
Oxalis cumingii Herb.	1832	species	= het.
Oxalis deflexa Poepp. ex Progel	1877	species	= het.
Oxalis dichotomiflora Steud.	1856	species	= het.
Oxalis geranioides R.Knuth	1919	species	= het.
Oxalis laxa var. hispidissima Gay	1846	variety	= het.
Oxalis laxa var. major R.Knuth	1930	variety	= het.
Oxalis laxa var. minor Barnéoud	1845	variety	= het.
Oxalis laxa var. rigida Barnéoud	1845	variety	= het.
Oxalis laxa var. violacea R.Knuth	1930	variety	= het.
Oxalis micrantha Bertero	1829	species	= het.
Oxalis micrantha var. alsinoides (Walp.) R.Knuth	1930	variety	= het.
Oxalis micrantha var. major R.Knuth	1930	variety	= het.
Oxalis micrantha var. purpurea R.Knuth	1930	variety	= het.
Oxalis micrantha var. setifera R.Knuth	1919	variety	= het.
Oxalis platycaulis Steud.	1841	species	= het.
Oxalis puberula Phil.	1865	species	= het., nom. illeg.
Oxalis pubescens Bertero ex Steud.	1841	species	= het., not validly publ.
Oxalis pygmaea Phil.	1857	species	= het., nom. illeg.
Oxalis rigida (Barnéoud) Lourteig	1988	species	= het.
Oxalis san-romani Phil.	1893	species	= het.
Oxalis torcana Phil.	1893	species	= het.
Oxalis vinaquillo Steud.	1856	species	= het.
Xanthoxalis laxa (Hook. & Arn.) Holub	1973	species	≡ hom.
Xanthoxalis micrantha (Bertero) Holub	1973	species	= het.
Notes: ≡ homotypic synonym ; = heterotypic synonym

=== Names ===
Oxalis laxa is known by the common names dwarf woodsorrel or dwarf wood-sorrel.

== Range ==
Dwarf woodsorrel is native to Argentina, Chile, Peru, and the Juan Fernández Islands. It also is introduced in Ecuador. In North America it is an introduced weed in California and has been seen along the North Coast and the Sierra Nevada foothills at elevations of as much as 1,000 meters (3,300 ft).
